= TO-8 =

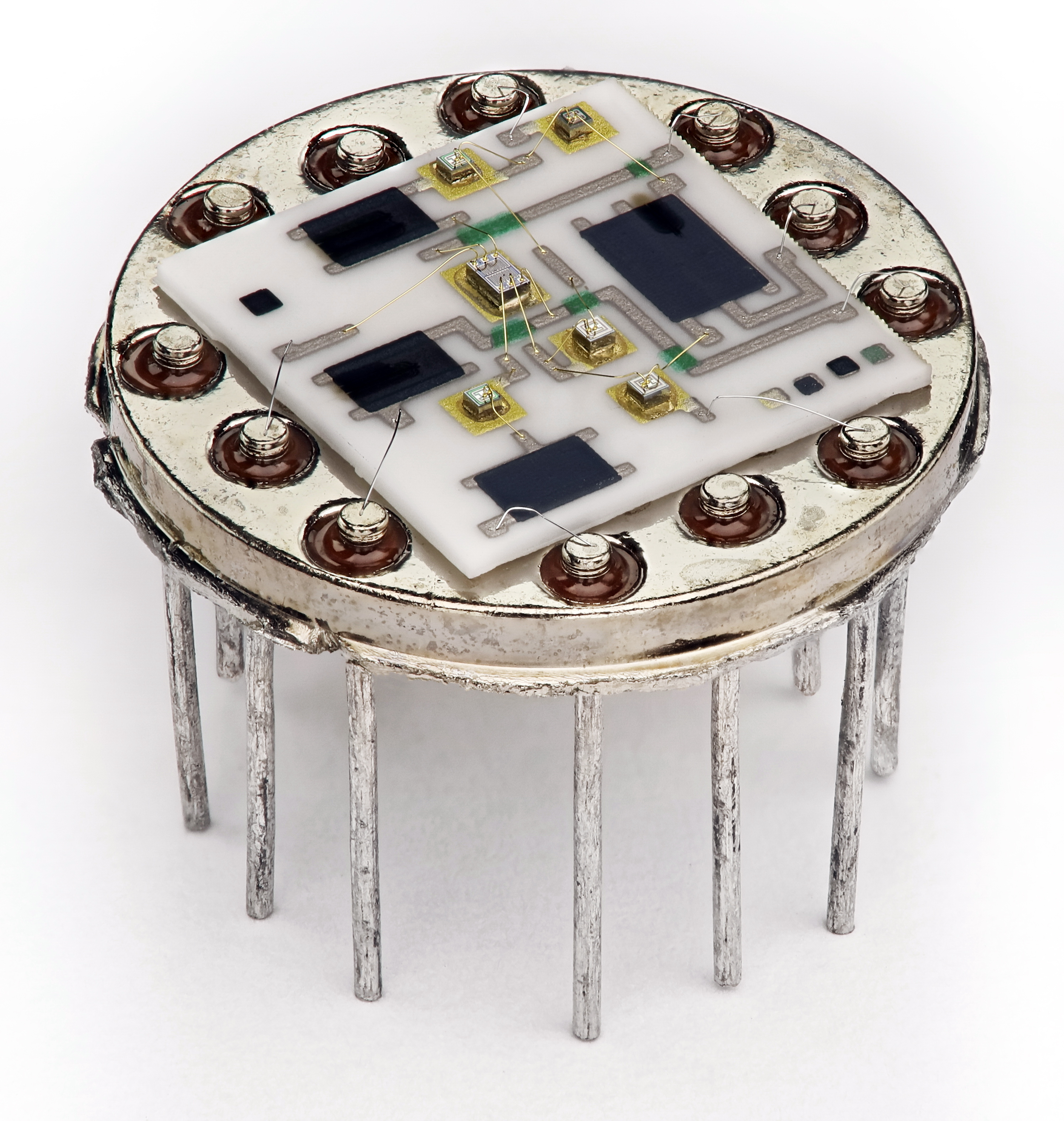
Hybrid integrated circuit (National Semiconductor LH033CG) in a variant of the TO-8 package with 12 leads

In electronics, TO-8 is a designation for a standardized metal semiconductor package. TO in TO-8 stands for "transistor outline" and refers to a series of technical drawings produced by JEDEC. The TO-8 package is noticeably larger than the more common TO-5 package. While originally designed for medium power transistors (that is, higher power than TO-5 but lower than TO-3) such as the 2N1483 series or the AD136, it is more commonly used for integrated circuits and sensors (see Variants below).

== Construction ==
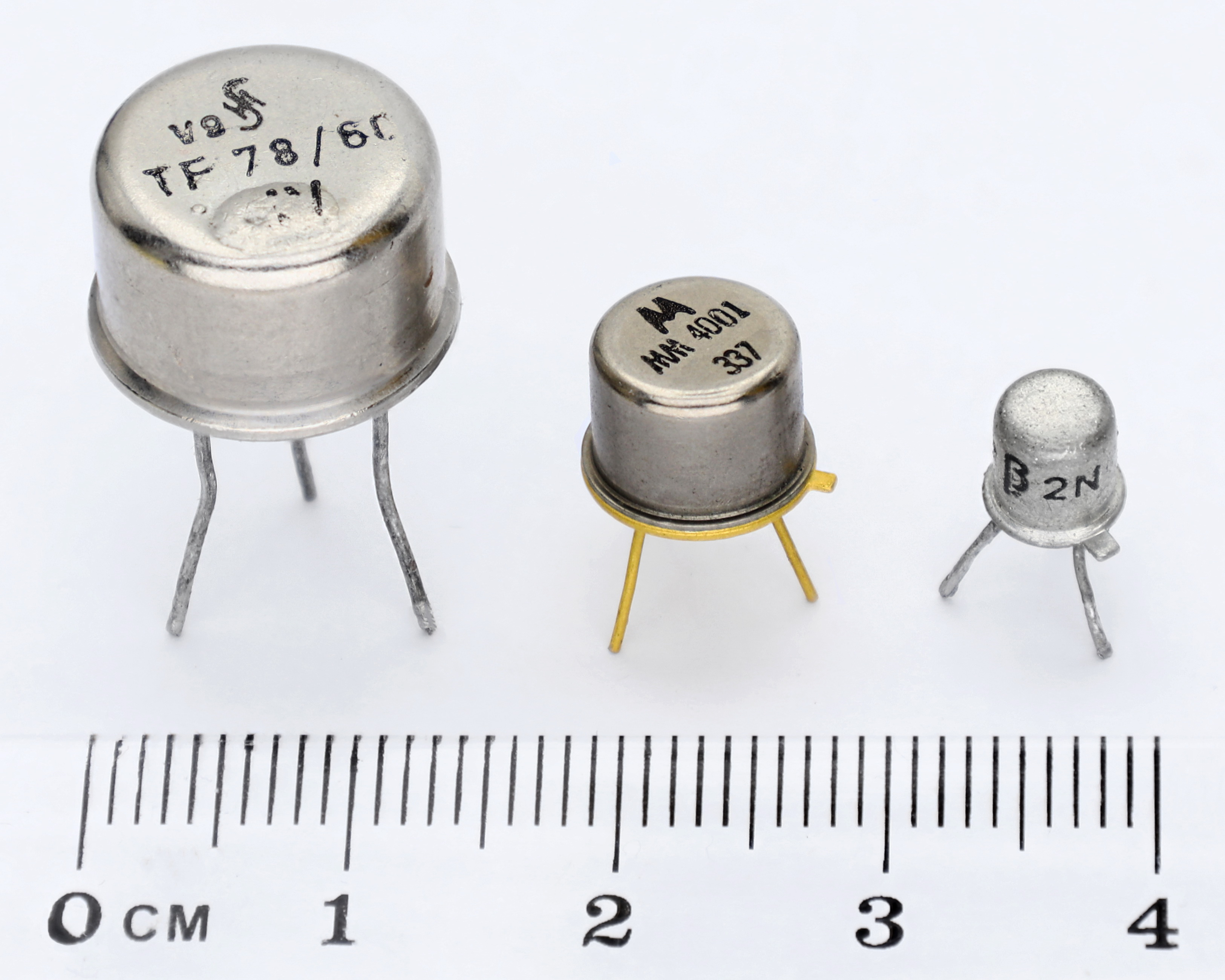
Size comparison between (left to right) TO-8, TO-5 and TO-18 packages

The typical TO-8 metal can package has a base diameter of 15.24 mm (0.600 in), a cap diameter of 12.29 mm (0.484 in), and a cap height of 7.62 mm (0.300 in). The lead diameter is nominally 0.76 mm (0.030 in). The leads are arranged on a circle with a diameter of 7.16 mm (0.282 in). The minimum length of the leads is 10.16 mm (0.400 in).

== Variants ==
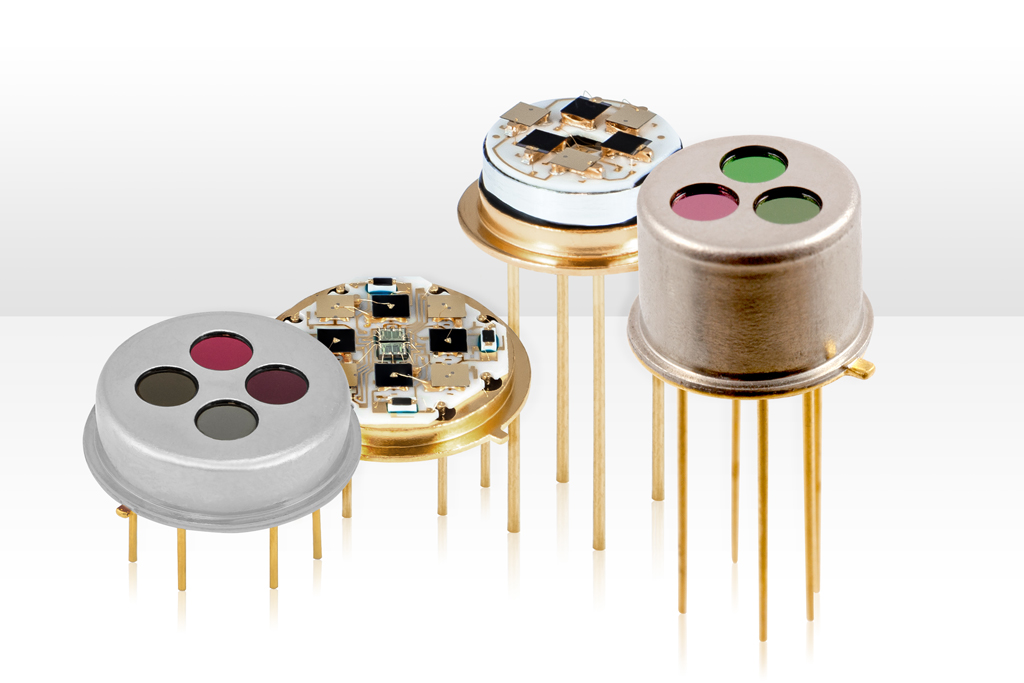
Left: sensor in a variant of the TO-8 package with 8 leads and windows (right: TO-5 package variant for comparison)

Several variants of the original TO-8 package have the same cap dimensions but differ in the number and length of the leads (wires). Somewhat incorrectly, TO-8 is often used in manufacturer's literature as a synonym for any package with the cap dimensions of TO-8, regardless of the number of leads, or even for any package with the diameter of TO-8, regardless of the cap height and the number of leads. Light-sensitive or light-emitting devices have a transparent window, lens, or parabolic reflectors in the top of the case rather than a sealed, flat top. There are variants with between 2 and 16 leads. For packages with more than 4 leads, the leads are usually arranged along the edges of a square with a side length of 10.16 mm (0.400 in) (rather than on a circle as in packages with up to 4 leads or for other metal can packages such as TO-101). These variants usually have a tab to identify lead number 1 and an increased cap diameter of 13.97 mm (0.550 in).

== National standards ==
TO-233 is intended to replace previous definitions of TO-8.

| Standards organization | Standard | Designation for |
| Standards organization | Standard | TO-8 |
|---|---|---|
| JEDEC | JEP95 | TO-233-AA |
| IEC | IEC 60191 (Note: These standards have separate drawings for the package case and the base.) | C8/B13 |
| DIN | DIN 41878 | 8A3 |
| EIAJ / JEITA | ED-7500A | TC-6/TB-7 |
| British Standards | BS 3934 | SO-22/SB3-9 |
