= C mount (laser) =

In laser technology, a C mount is a method of packaging a laser diode using an alloy of copper and tungsten (CuW, hence "C mount") as a heatsink for the laser component. Typical wavelengths of laser energy generated by C mount devices are between 680 and 980 nm, and with a typical output power rating of up to 7 watts. They are one of three commonly used mounts for laser assemblies, the others being the T-can or TO-can for Transistor Outline Package TO-5 and the so-called "butterfly" mount.
