= EIAJ connector =

Type of coaxial power connector

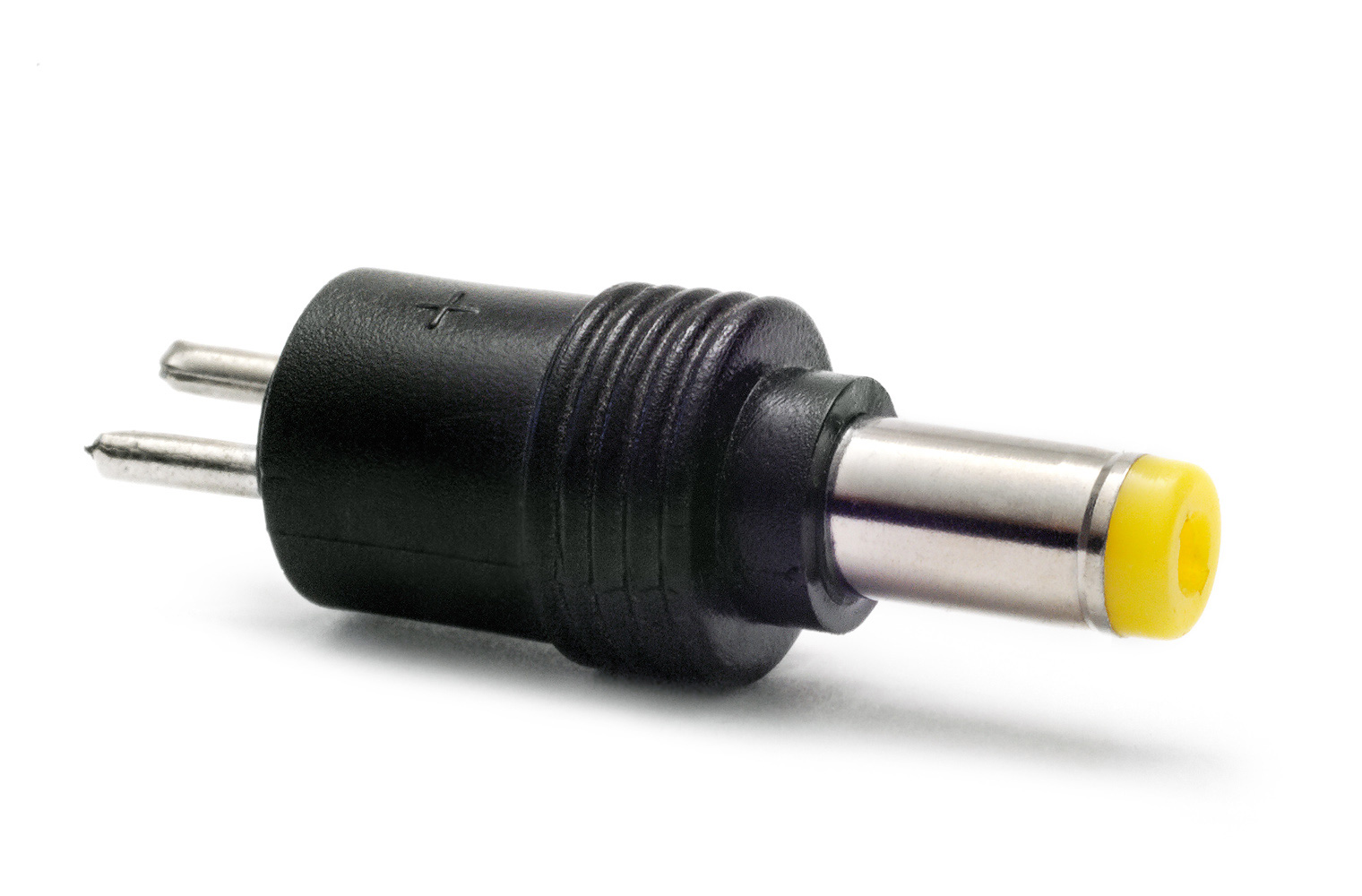
A yellow-tipped EIAJ connector

The EIAJ connector type, more formally known as EIAJ RC-5320A, is a type of coaxial power connector or jack for small appliances.

== Features ==
The entire series of connectors has a built-in retention feature. On types 1, 2, and 3 this involves a bevel on the barrel near the tip, while on types 4 and 5 the tip of the insulator ring has a larger diameter than the metal barrel.

== Types ==
The design philosophy is that higher voltages should be supplied via larger plugs to prevent equipment damage. A larger plug will not go into a smaller jack.

Connector Name	Minimum Voltage	Rated Voltage	Rated Current	Outer Diameter	Inner Diameter	Pin Diameter	Shaft Length
EIAJ-01	0 V	3.15 V	2 A	plug: 2.35 mm jack: 2.75 mm hole	plug: 0.7 mm jack: 0.65 mm pin	none	9.5~13 mm
EIAJ-02	3.15 V	6.3 V	2 A	plug: 4.0 mm jack: 4.4 mm hole	plug: 1.7 mm jack: 1.65 mm pin	none	9.5 mm
EIAJ-03	6.3 V	10.5 V	2 A	plug: 4.75 mm jack: 5.15 mm hole	plug: 1.7 mm jack: 1.65 mm pin	none	9.5~12 mm
EIAJ-04	10.5 V	13.5 V	2 A	5.5 mm	3.3 mm	1.0 mm	9.5~13.5 mm
EIAJ-05	13.5 V	18.0 V	2 A	6.5 mm	4.4 mm	1.4 mm	9.5~16 mm

== History ==
This standard was originally created in 1992 as EIAJ RC-6705, updated in 1997, and updated again in 2005.

The Electronic Industries Association of Japan (EIAJ) and the Japan Electronic Industries Development Association have merged to form the Japan Electronics and Information Technology Industries Association (JEITA), an electronics and IT industry trade organization.

== ET-2502A ==
The use of these connectors on equipment is defined in JEITA ET-2502A. For instance, this document describes the interface between a car cigarette plug or RC-5321 plug and the powered device, the polarity symbol used (JEITA CP-1104A),

== EIAJ RC-5321 ==
This is a unique-looking barrel connector, apparently intended for providing a DC output jack (most DC jacks are used for power input).

Possibly available in multiple voltage ranges, the one for voltage classification 2 (3.15 to 6.3 V) has an outside diameter of 4.75 mm and a protruding pin of 2.5 mm diameter.

Previously known as EIAJ RCX-5321.

== EIAJ RC-5322 ==
According to Hosiden, this is a 12V/24V barrel connector designed for electronic equipment used in cars. The outside diameter is 6.5mm.

Previously known as EIAJ RCX-5322.

== Companies that use this standard ==
- Sony - Japan
- Pioneer - Japan
- Panasonic Formerly Matsushita Electric Industrial Co., Ltd. - Japan

== See also ==
- Coaxial power connector
- DC connector
- Phone connector (audio)
- JEITA
