= JEIDA memory card =

Memory card format

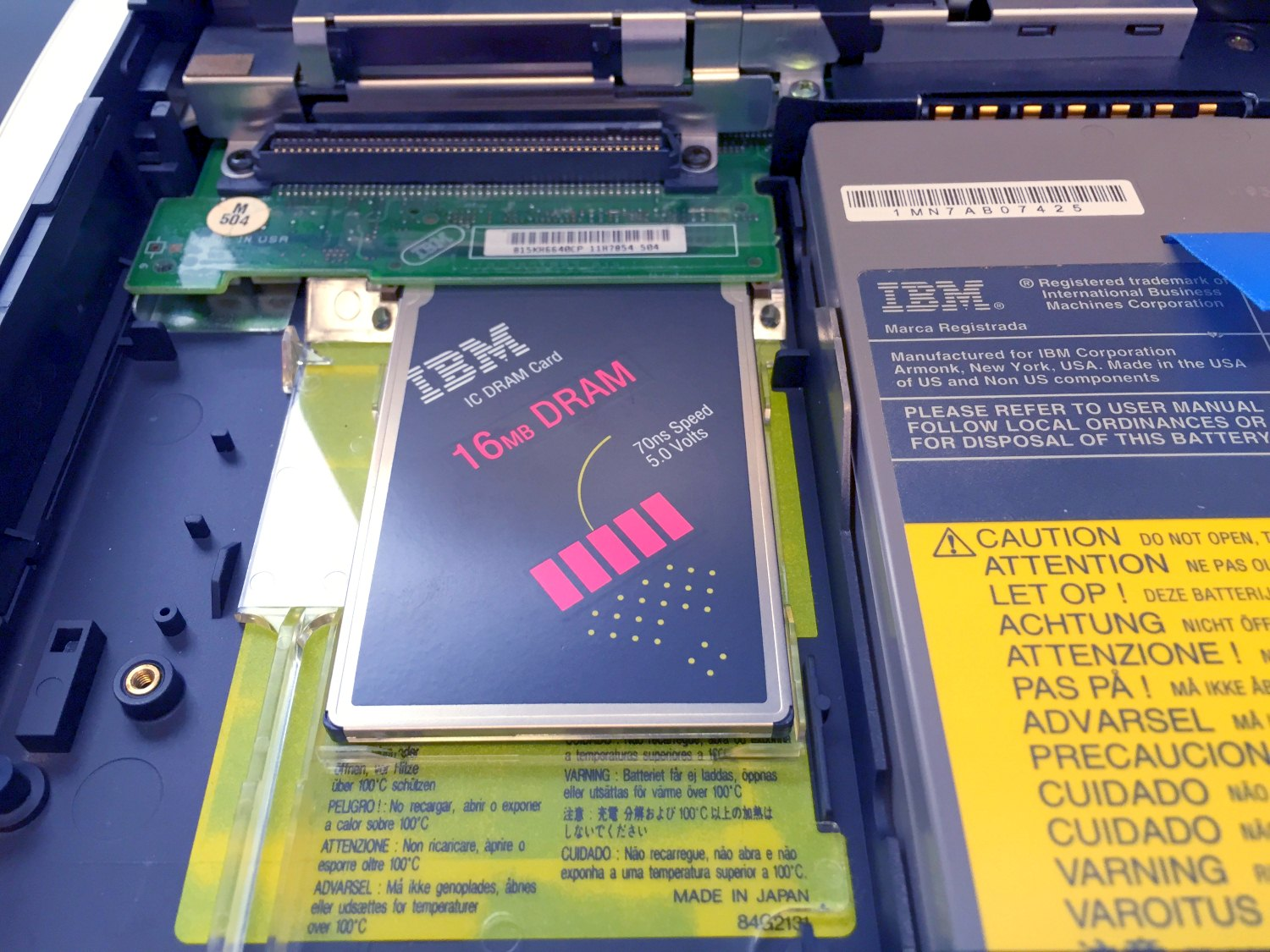
IBM IC DRAM card in a ThinkPad 360PE

The JEIDA memory card standard is a popular memory card standard at the beginning of memory cards appearing on portable computers. JEIDA cards could be used to expand system memory or as a solid-state storage drive.

== History ==
Before the advent of the JEIDA standard, laptops had proprietary cards that were not interoperable with other manufacturers laptops, other laptop lines, or even other models in the same line. The establishment of the JEIDA interface and cards across Japanese portables provoked a response from the US government, through SEMATECH, and thus PCMCIA was born. PCMCIA and JEIDA worked to solve this rift between the two competing standards, and merged into JEIDA 4.0 or PCMCIA 1.0 in 1990.

== Usage ==
The JEIDA memory card was used in earlier ThinkPad models, where IBM branded them as IC DRAM Cards.

The interface has also been used in SRAM cards.

== Versions ==
- Version 1.0 is an 88-pin memory card. It has 2 rows of pin holes which are shifted against each other by half the pin spacing. The card is 3.3mm thick. Released in 1986.
- Version 2.0 is only mechanically compatible with the Version 1.0 card. Version 1.0 cards fail in devices designed for Version 2.0. Released in 1987.
- Version 3 is a 68-pin memory card. It is also used in the Neo Geo. Released in 1989 and has variants with 20, 34, 40 and 68 pins.
- Version 4.0 corresponds with 68-pin PCMCIA 1.0 (1990).
- Version 4.1 unified the PCMCIA and JEIDA standards as PCMCIA 2.0. v4.1 is the 16-bit PC Card standard that defines Type I, II, III, and IV card sizes.
- Version 4.2 is the PCMCIA 2.1 standard, and introduced CardBus' 32-bit interface in an almost physically identical casing.

== See also ==
- Japan Electronic Industries Development Association
- Japan Electronics and Information Technology Industries Association
- Personal Computer Memory Card International Association
- Compact Flash
