= Barrel jack =

Barrel jack may refer to:

- A type of heavy-duty jack (device), used for lifting vehicles or other heavy loads off the ground for maintenance and repair
- A type of coaxial power connector, commonly used to provide low-voltage DC power to electronic devices
