= PC Card =

Expansion card standard for laptop computers

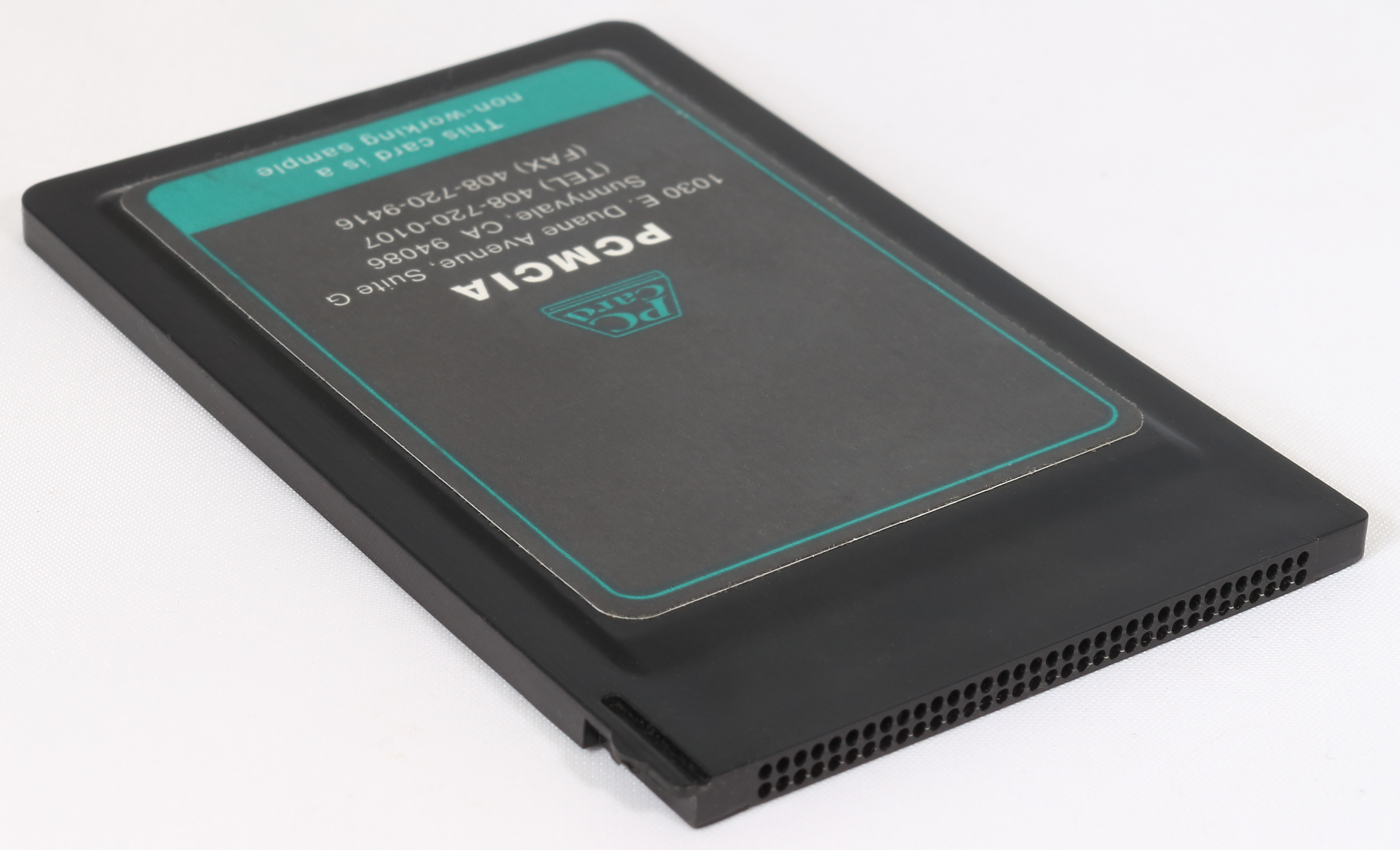
- A PC Card, showing the side where it connects to a computer
- Year created: 1990
- Created by: PCMCIA
- Superseded by: ExpressCard (2003)
- Width in bits: 16 or 32
- No. of devices: 1 per slot
- Speed: 133 MB/s
- Style: Parallel
- Hotplugging interface: Yes
- External interface: Yes
- Website: pc-card.com at the Wayback Machine (archived 1997-12-11)

PC Card is a technical standard specifying an expansion card interface for laptops and PDAs. The PCMCIA originally introduced the 16-bit ISA-based PCMCIA Card in 1990, but renamed it to PC Card in March 1995 to avoid confusion with the name of the organization. The CardBus PC Card was introduced as a 32-bit version of the original PC Card, based on the PCI specification. CardBus slots are backward compatible, but older slots are not forward compatible with CardBus cards.

Although originally designed as a standard for memory-expansion cards for computer storage, the existence of a usable general standard for notebook peripherals led to the development of many kinds of devices including network cards, modems, and hard disks.

The PC Card port has been superseded by the ExpressCard interface since 2003, which was also initially developed by the PCMCIA. The organization dissolved in 2009, with its assets merged into the USB Implementers Forum.

== Applications ==
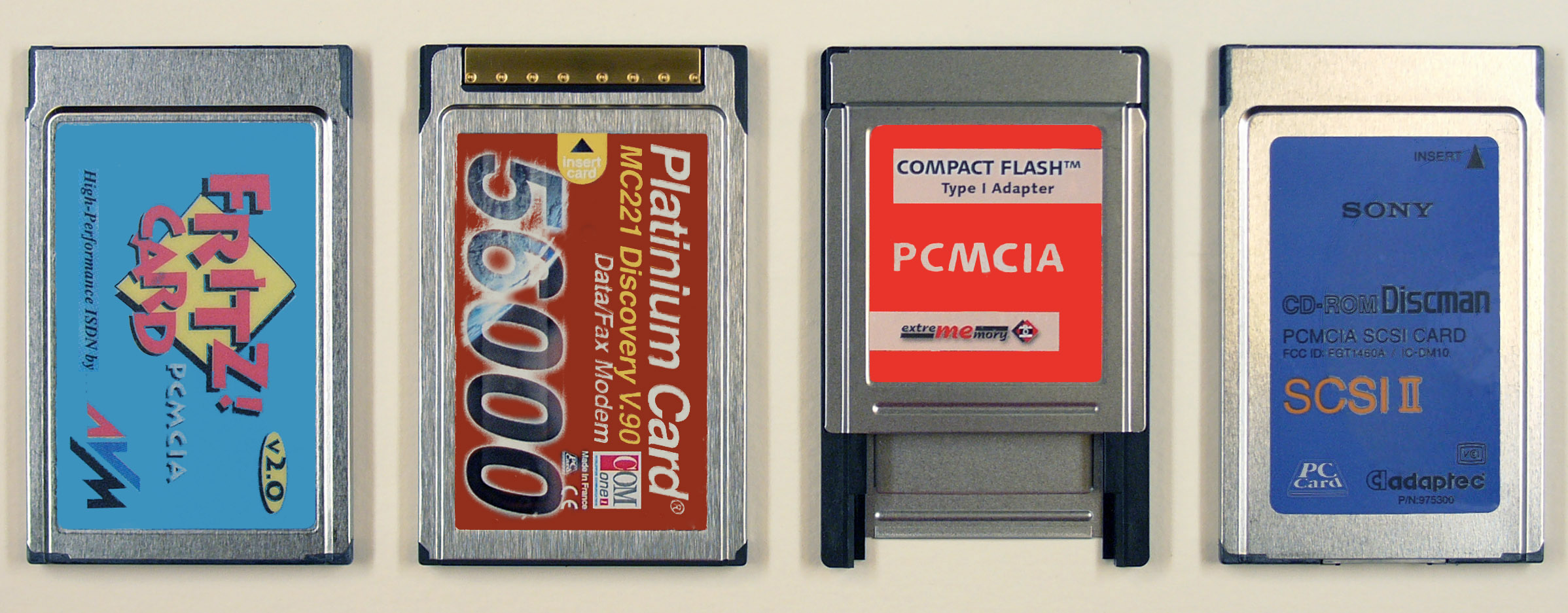
Various PC Cards, from left to right: • ISDN PC Card • ITU-T V.90 modem CardBus PC Card • CompactFlash (CF) adapter PC Card • SCSI II PC Card

Many notebooks in the 1990s had two adjacent type-II slots, which allowed installation of two type-II cards or one, double-thickness, type-III card. The cards were also used in early digital SLR cameras, such as the Kodak DCS 300 series. However, their original use as storage expansion is no longer common.

Some manufacturers such as Dell continued to offer them into 2012 on their ruggedized XFR notebooks.

Mercedes-Benz used a PCMCIA card reader in the W221 S-Class for model years 2006–2009. It was used for reading media files such as MP3 audio files to play through the COMAND infotainment system. After 2009, it was replaced with a standard SD Card reader.

Some vehicles from the 2010s from Honda and Nissan included a PC Card reader integrated into the audio system.

Some Japanese brand consumer entertainment devices such as TV sets include a PC Card slot for playback of media.

Most TVs with satellite reception feature a Conditional-access module which is a PC Card slot for decoding channels.

Adapters for PC Cards to Personal Computer ISA slots were available when these technologies were current. Cardbus adapters for PCI slots have been made. These adapters were sometimes used to fit Wireless (802.11) PCMCIA cards into desktop computers with PCI slots.

The Taito G-NET arcade hardware, based on the original PlayStation, uses PC Card as a software distribution method to allow games to be replaced without total replacement of the arcade board. Konami also used the PC Card on their System 573 hardware, also based on the original PlayStation, for similar purposes. Early PlayStation 2 models in Japan (SCPH-10000, SCPH-15000 and SCPH-18000) included a PC Card slot for installing a network adapter (PC Card version; SCPH-10190) and an external hard disk drive (SCPH-20400); this was replaced by the Expansion Bay on later models (SCPH-3000x onwards).

== History ==
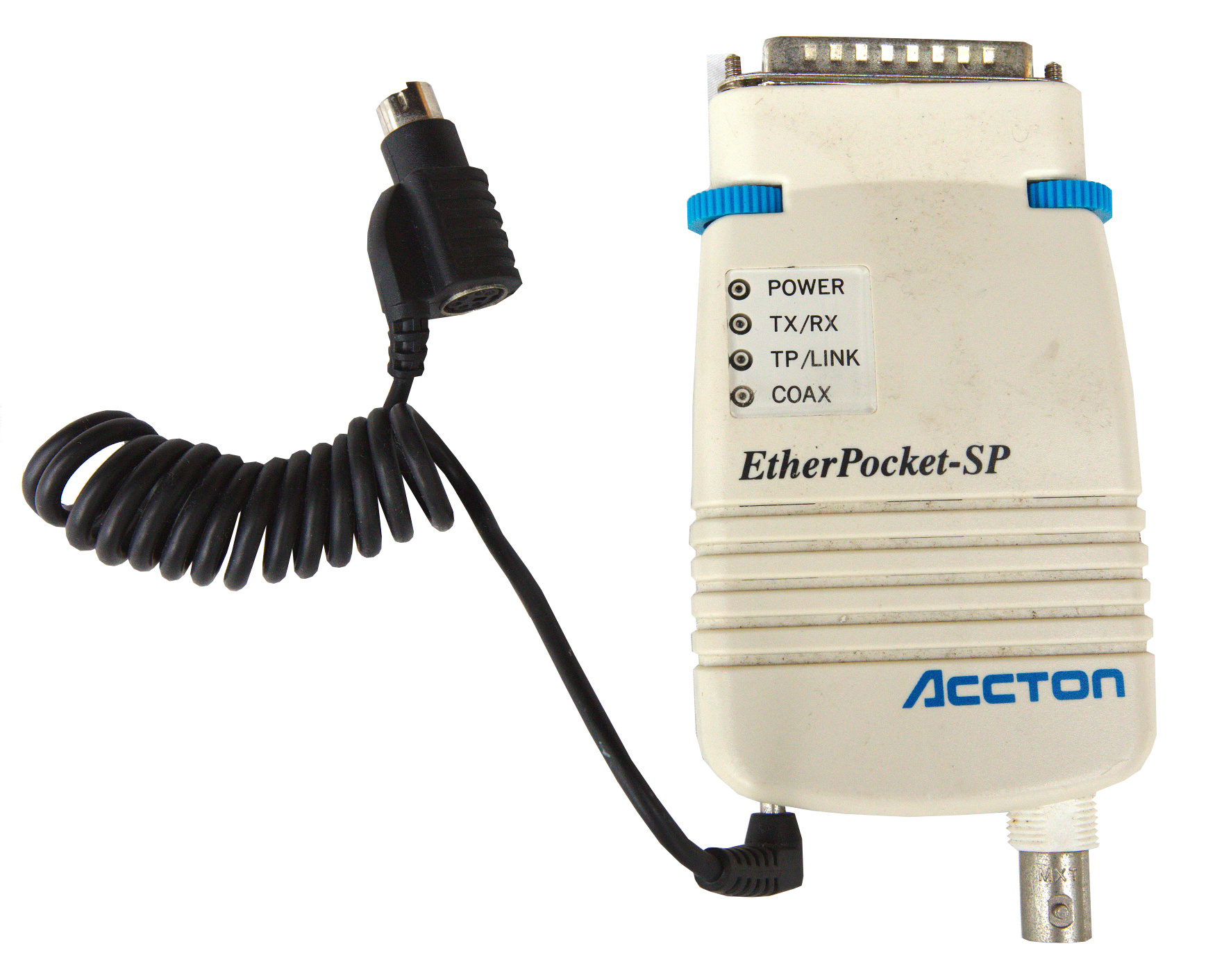
Parallel port Ethernet adapters were commonly used before PC Cards. This is an Accton Etherpocket-SP parallel port Ethernet adapter (c. 1990). Supports both coaxial (10BASE2) and twisted pair (10BASE-T) cables. Power is drawn from a PS/2 port passthrough cable.

Before the introduction of the PCMCIA card, the parallel port was commonly used for portable peripherals.

The PCMCIA 1.0 card standard was published by the Personal Computer Memory Card International Association in November 1990 and was soon adopted by more than eighty vendors. It corresponds with the Japanese JEIDA memory card 4.0 standard. It was originally developed to support Memory cards.

Intel authored the Exchangeable Card Architecture (ExCA) specification, but later merged this into the PCMCIA.

SanDisk (operating at the time as "SunDisk") launched its PCMCIA card in October 1992. The company was the first to introduce a writeable Flash RAM card for the HP 95LX (an early MS-DOS pocket computer). These cards conformed to a supplemental PCMCIA-ATA standard that allowed them to appear as more conventional IDE hard drives to the 95LX or a PC. This had the advantage of raising the upper limit on capacity to the full 32 MB available under DOS 3.22 on the 95LX.

New Media Corporation was one of the first companies established for the express purpose of manufacturing PC Cards; they became a major OEM for laptop manufacturers such as Toshiba and Compaq for PC Card products.

It soon became clear that the PCMCIA card standard needed expansion to support "smart" I/O cards to address the emerging need for fax, modem, LAN, harddisk and floppy disk cards. It also needed interrupt facilities and hot plugging, which required the definition of new BIOS and operating system interfaces. This led to the introduction of release 2.0 of the PCMCIA standard and JEIDA 4.1 in September 1991, which saw corrections and expansion with Card Services (CS) in the PCMCIA 2.1 standard in November 1992.

To recognize increased scope beyond memory, and to aid in marketing, the association acquired the rights to the simpler term "PC Card" from IBM. This was the name of the standard from version 2 of the specification onwards. These cards were used for wireless networks, modems, and other functions in notebook PCs.

After the release of PCIe-based ExpressCard in 2003, laptop manufacturers started to fit ExpressCard slots to new laptops instead of PC Card slots.

== Form factors ==
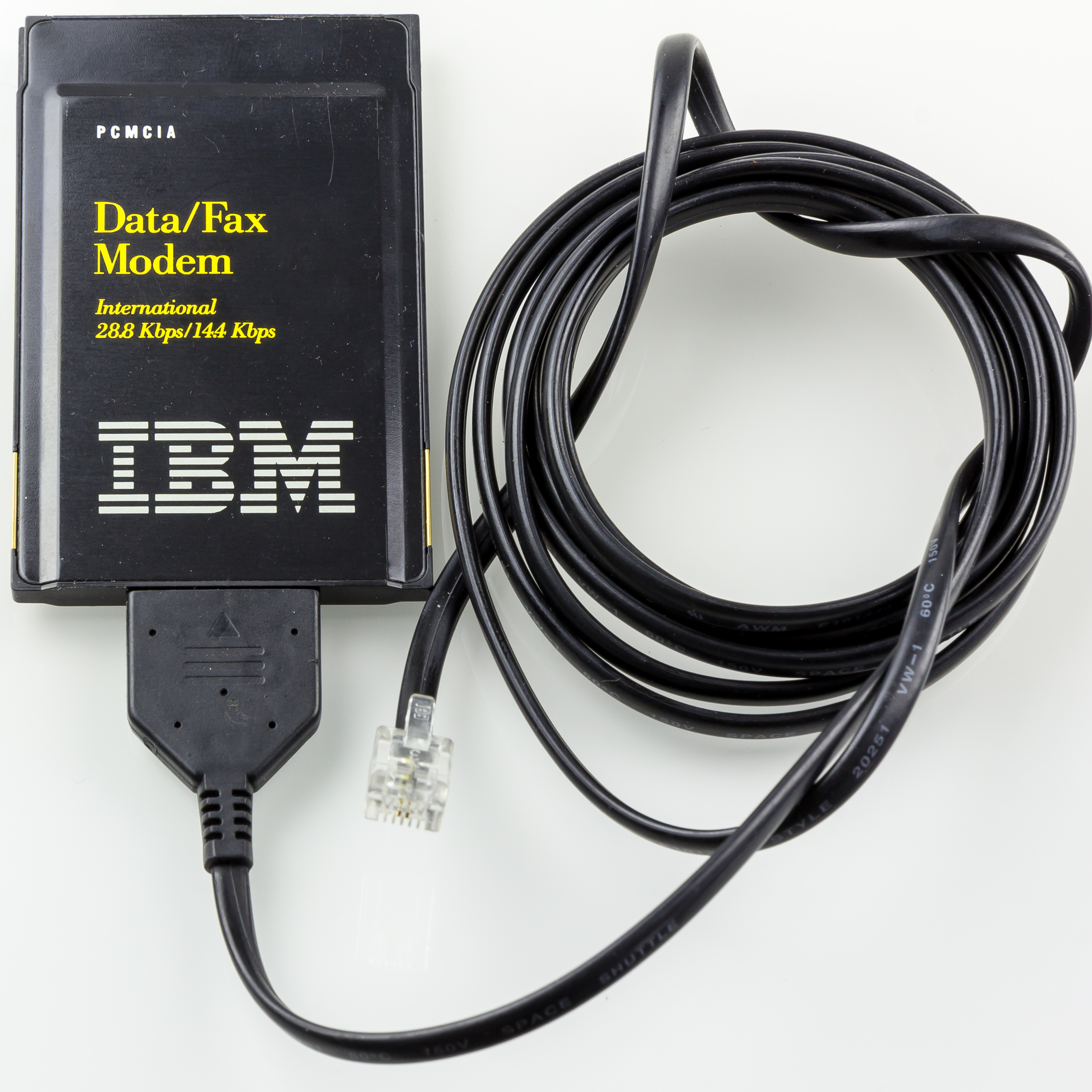
16-bit Type II PC Card: IBM V.34 data/fax modem, manufactured by TDK

All PC Card devices use a similar sized package which is 85.6 millimetres (3.37 in) long and 54.0 millimetres (2.13 in) wide, the same size as a credit card.

Type I
Cards designed to the original specification (PCMCIA 1.0) are type I and have a 16-bit interface. They are 3.3 millimetres (0.13 in) thick and have a dual row of 34 holes (68 in total) along a short edge as a connecting interface. Type-I PC Card devices are typically used for memory devices such as RAM, flash memory, OTP (One-Time Programmable), and SRAM cards.
Type II
introduced with version 2.0 of the standard. Type-II and above PC Card devices use two rows of 34 sockets, and have a 16- or 32-bit interface. They are 5.0 millimetres (0.20 in) thick. Type-II cards introduced I/O support, allowing devices to attach an array of peripherals or to provide connectors/slots to interfaces for which the host computer had no built-in support. For example, many modem, network, and TV cards accept this configuration. Due to their thinness, most Type II interface cards have miniature interface connectors on the card connecting to a dongle, a short cable that adapts from the card's miniature connector to an external full-size connector. Some cards instead have a lump on the end with the connectors. This is more robust and convenient than a separate adapter but can block the other slot where slots are present in a pair. Some Type II cards, most notably network interface and modem cards, have a retractable jack, which can be pushed into the card and will pop out when needed, allowing insertion of a cable from above. When use of the card is no longer needed, the jack can be pushed back into the card and locked in place, protecting it from damage. Most network cards have their jack on one side, while most modems have their jack on the other side, allowing the use of both at the same time as they do not interfere with each other. Wireless Type II cards often had a plastic shroud that jutted out from the end of the card to house the antenna. In the mid-90s, PC Card Type II hard disk drive cards became available; previously, PC Card hard disk drives were only available in Type III.
Type III
introduced with version 2.01 of the standard in 1992. Type-III PC Card devices are 16-bit or 32-bit. These cards are 10.5 millimetres (0.41 in) thick, allowing them to accommodate devices with components that would not fit type I or type II height. Examples are hard disk drive cards, and interface cards with full-size connectors that do not require dongles (as is commonly required with type II interface cards).
Type IV
Type-IV cards, introduced by Toshiba, were not officially standardized or sanctioned by the PCMCIA. These cards are 16 millimetres (0.63 in) thick.

== Bus ==
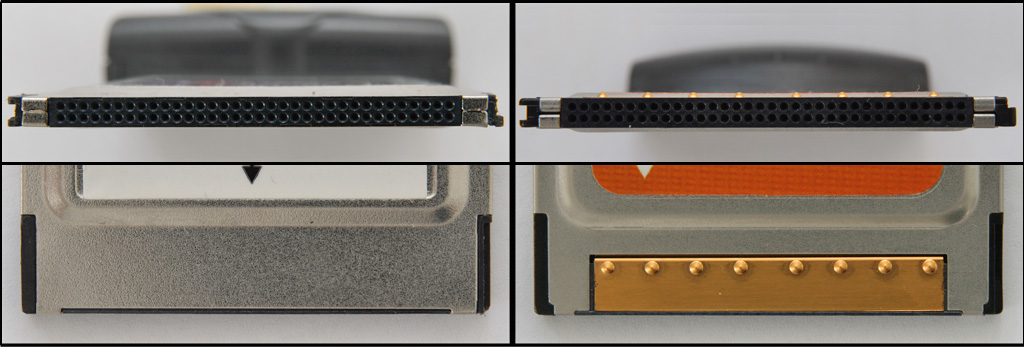
Left: connector of a 16-bit ISA-based PC Card. Right: connector of a 32-bit PCI-based CardBus PC Card. Usually, CardBus PC Card slots are compatible with the ISA-based PC Cards, but not the other way around.

=== Original ===
The original standard was defined for both 5 V and 3.3 volt cards, with 3.3 V cards having a key on the side to prevent them from being inserted fully into a 5 V-only slot. Some cards and some slots operate at both voltages as needed. The original standard was built around an "enhanced" 16-bit ISA bus platform.

=== CardBus ===
CardBus are PCMCIA 5.0 or later (JEIDA 4.2 or later) 32-bit PCMCIA devices, introduced in 1995 and present in laptops from late 1997 onward. CardBus is effectively a 32-bit, 33 MHz PCI bus in the PC Card design. CardBus supports bus mastering, which allows a controller on the bus to talk to other devices or memory without going through the CPU. Many chipsets, such as those that support Wi-Fi, are available for both PCI and CardBus.

The notch on the left hand front of the device is slightly shallower on a CardBus device so, by design, a 32-bit device cannot be plugged into earlier equipment supporting only 16-bit devices. Most new slots accept both CardBus and the original 16-bit PC Card devices. CardBus cards can be distinguished from older cards by the presence of a gold band with eight small studs on the top of the card next to the pin sockets.

The speed of CardBus interfaces in 32-bit burst mode depends on the transfer type: in byte mode, transfer is 33 MB/s; in word mode it is 66 MB/s; and in dword (double-word) mode 132 MB/s.

=== CardBay ===
CardBay is a variant added to the PCMCIA specification introduced in 2001. It was intended to add some forward compatibility with USB and IEEE 1394, but was not universally adopted and only some notebooks have PC Card controllers with CardBay features. This is an implementation of Microsoft and Intel's joint Drive Bay initiative.

== Design ==
The card information structure (CIS) is metadata stored on a PC card that contains information about the formatting and organization of the data on the card. The CIS also contains information such as:

- Type of card
- Supported power supply options
- Supported power saving capabilities
- Manufacturer
- Model number

When a card is unrecognized it is frequently because the CIS information is either lost or damaged.

== Descendants and variants ==
=== CompactFlash ===
The interface has spawned a generation of flash memory cards that set out to improve on the size and features of Type I cards: CompactFlash, MiniCard, P2 Card and SmartMedia. For example, the PC Card electrical specification is also used for CompactFlash, so a PC Card CompactFlash adapter can be a passive physical adapter rather than requiring additional circuitry. CompactFlash is a smaller dimensioned 50 pin subset of the 68 pin PC Card interface. It includes a setting for the interface mode of either "memory" (using the limited PC Card addressing mode) or "ATA storage" (using PCMCIA-ATA addressing mode).

=== ExpressCard ===
ExpressCard is a later specification from the PCMCIA, intended as a replacement for PC Card, built around the PCI Express and USB 2.0 standards. The PC Card standard is closed to further development and PCMCIA strongly encourages future product designs to utilize the ExpressCard interface. From about 2006, ExpressCard slots replaced PCMCIA slots in laptop computers, with a few laptops having both in the transition period.

ExpressCard and CardBus sockets are physically and electrically incompatible. ExpressCard-to-CardBus and Cardbus-to-ExpressCard adapters are available that connect a Cardbus card to an Expresscard slot, or vice versa, and carry out the required electrical interfacing. These adapters do not handle older non-Cardbus PCMCIA cards.

PC Card devices can be plugged into an ExpressCard adapter, which provides a PCI-to-PCIe Bridge.

Despite being much faster in speed/bandwidth, ExpressCard was not as popular as PC Card, due in part to the ubiquity of USB ports on modern computers. Most functionality provided by PC Card or ExpressCard devices is now available as an external USB device. These USB devices have the advantage of being compatible with desktop computers as well as portable devices. (Desktop computers were rarely fitted with a PC Card or ExpressCard slot.) This reduced the requirement for internal expansion slots; by 2011, many laptops had none.

=== Others ===
Some IBM ThinkPad laptops took their onboard RAM (in sizes ranging from 4 to 16 MB) in the factor of an IC-DRAM Card. While very similar in form-factor, these cards did not go into a standard PC Card Slot, often being installed under the keyboard, for example. They also were not pin-compatible, as they had 88 pins but in two staggered rows, as opposed to even rows like PC Cards. These correspond to versions 1 and 2 of the JEIDA memory card standard.

The shape is also used by the Common Interface form of conditional-access modules for DVB, and by Panasonic for their professional "P2" video acquisition memory cards.

A CableCARD conditional-access module is a type II PC Card intended to be plugged into a cable set-top box or digital cable-ready television.

The EOMA68 open-source hardware standard uses the same 68-pin PC Card connectors and corresponds to the PC Card form factor in many other ways.

== See also ==
- List of device bandwidths
- Mobile modem – Modem providing Internet access via a wireless connection
- XJACK – Extendable connector for a type II PC card
- Zoomed video port – Unidirectional video bus allowing laptops to display real-time video
