= XJACK =

Extendable connector for a type II PC card

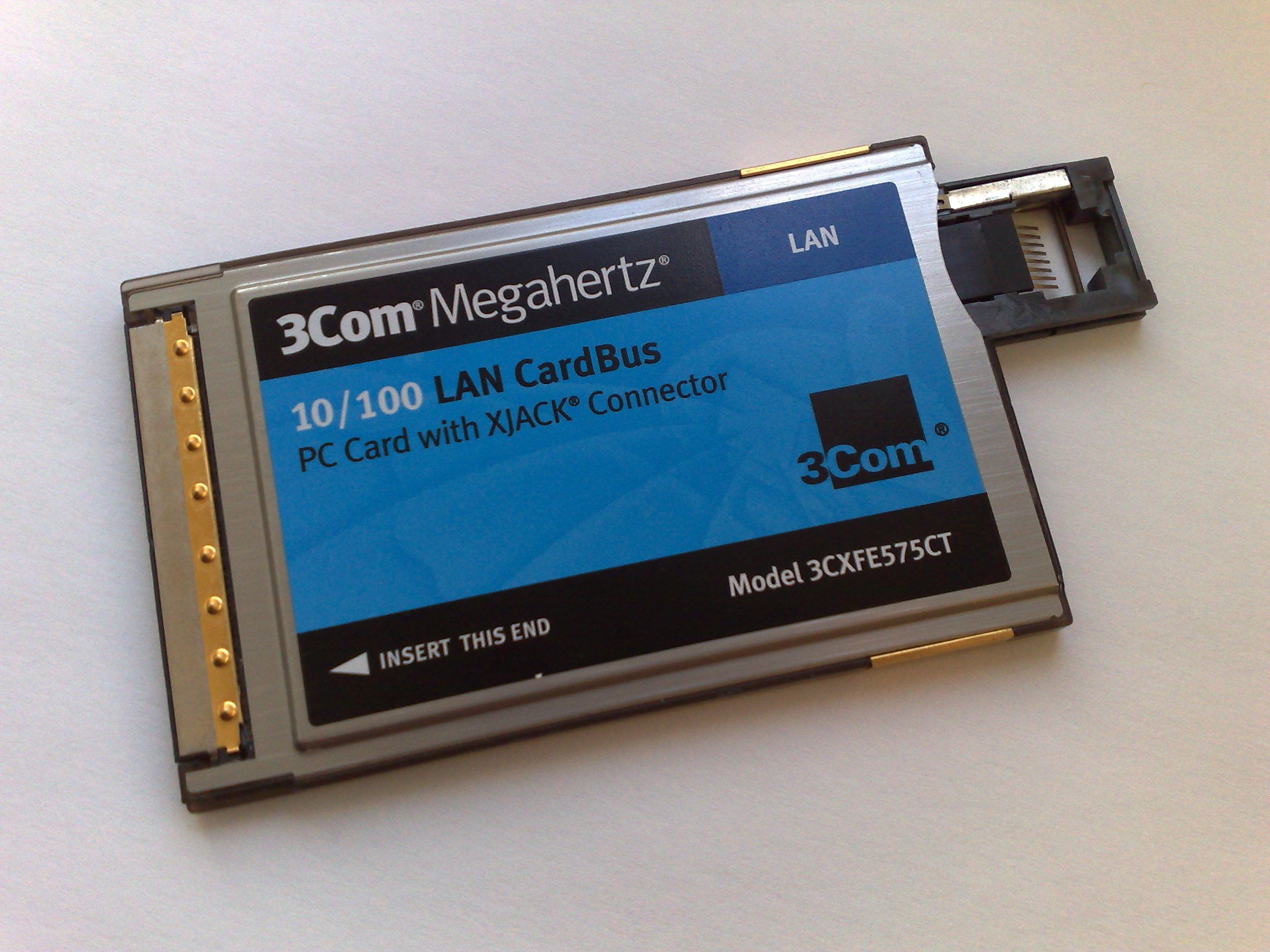
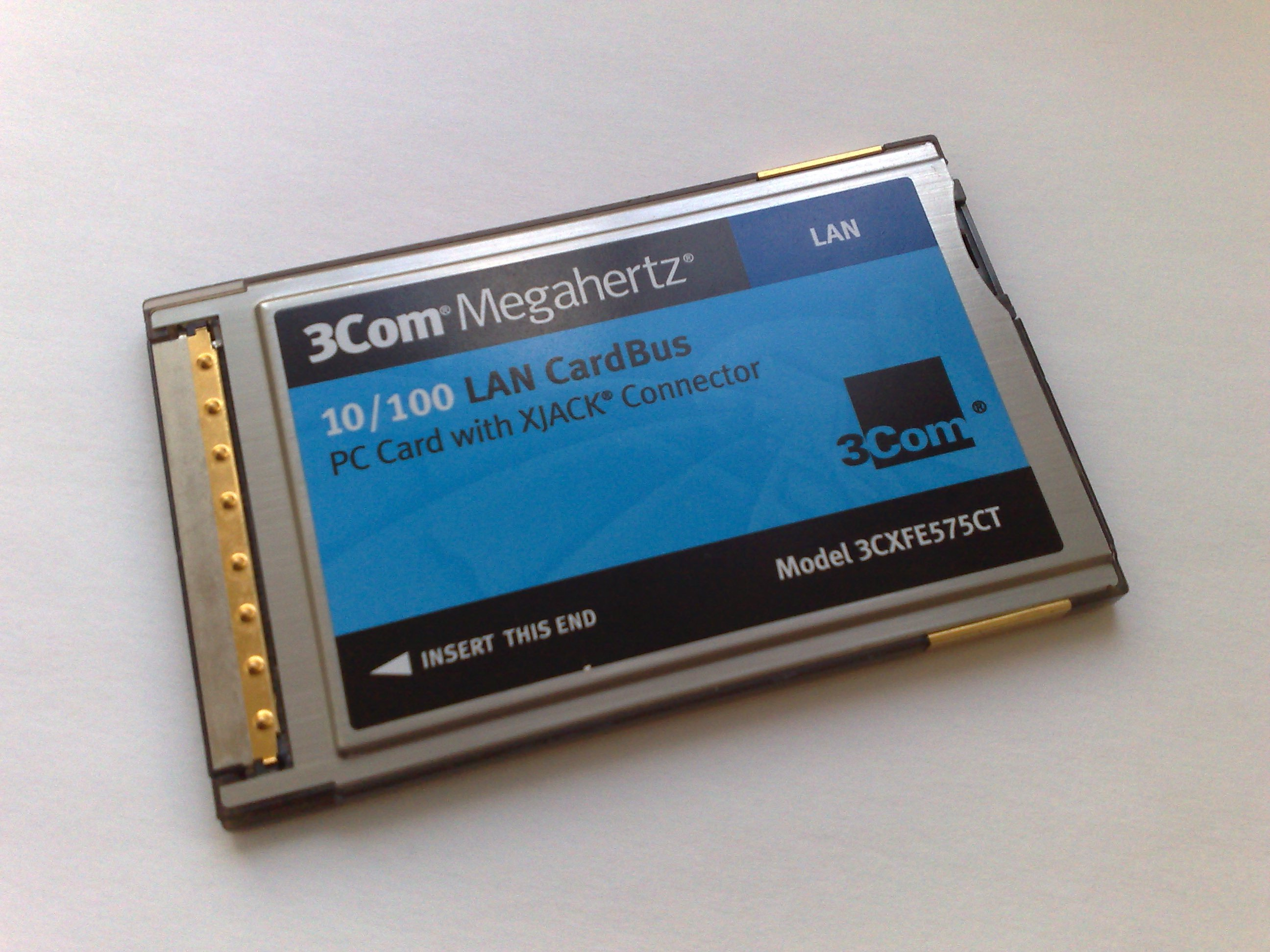
The XJACK extends from the PC Card for use, and retracts back for storage

In laptop computing, the XJACK is a type of extendable connector or antenna for a type II PC card, designed by the Megahertz subsidiary of 3Com. When not in use, the XJACK retracts into the PC card for storage.

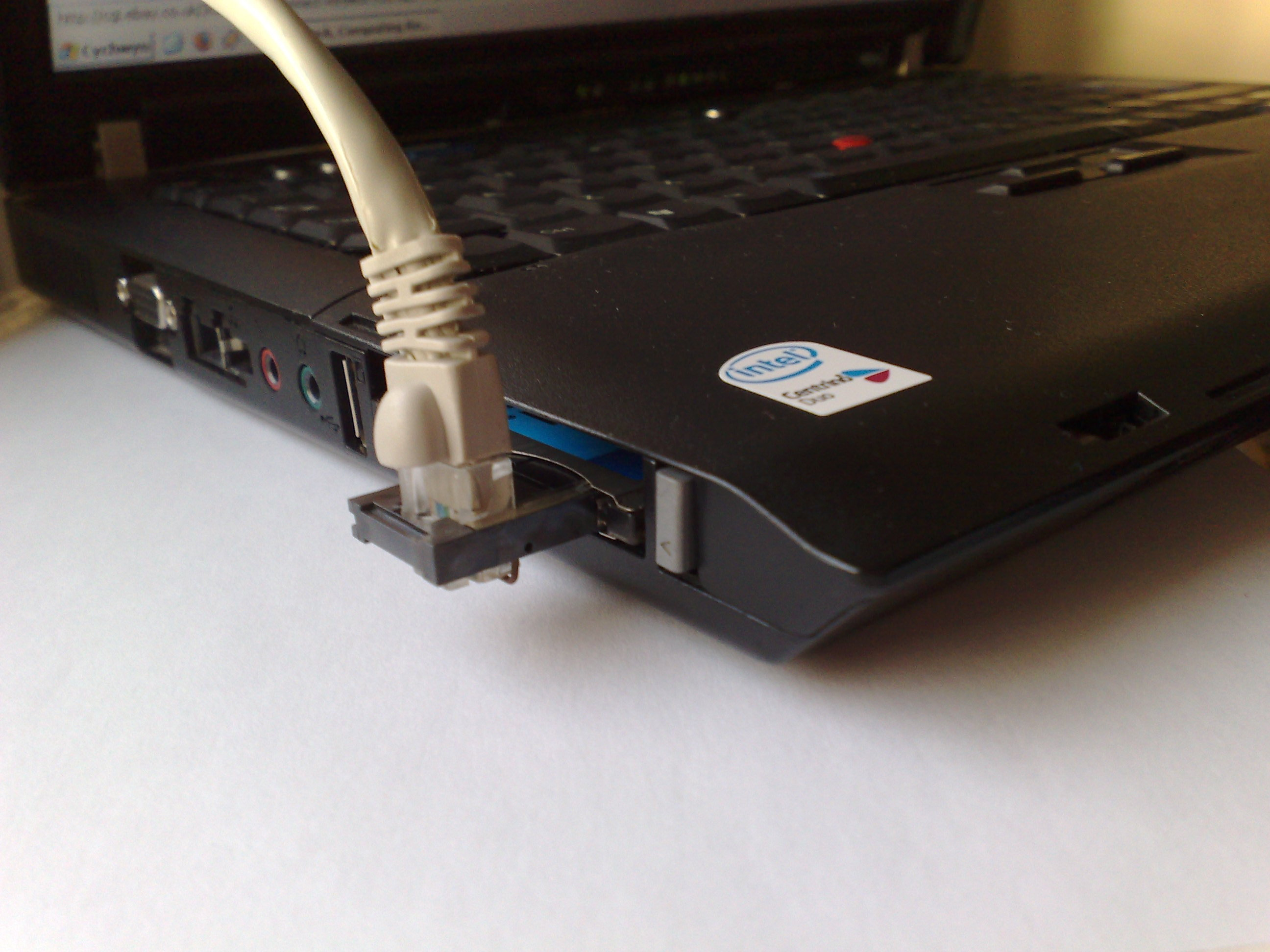
A network card with an XJACK connector, inserted in the Cardbus slot of a laptop, with a network cable plugged in.

The XJACK was originally used in modem and network cards, to attach a standard RJ11 or 8P8C plug directly to the PC card. They do not require a separate dongle, which could be lost or misplaced, and do not need to be removed from the laptop when travelling. An alternative approach is to use larger type III cards with a regular modular connector socket, but this approach requires more space.

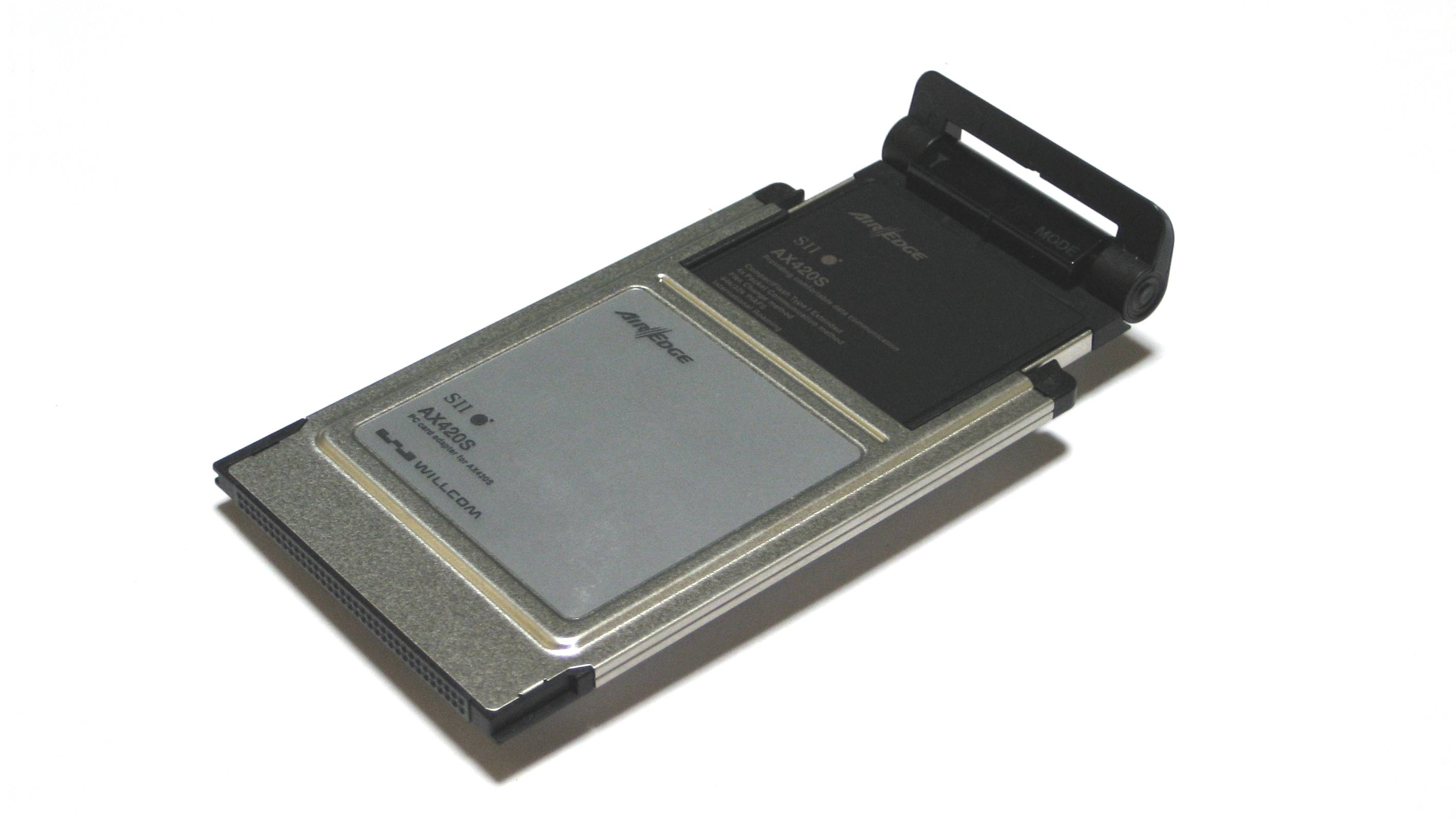
A Wi-Fi card made by Seiko Instruments, which also uses an extendable antenna

Wi-Fi PC cards for accessing wireless networks have an external portion containing the antenna for improved reception (as compared with inside the laptop), but this portion of the card may be accidentally damaged while moving the laptop. 3Com manufactured wireless cards with retractable antenna portions, also under the XJACK name. Other companies have since manufactured wireless cards with retractable antennas.
