= Coaxial power connector =

Type of electrical power connector

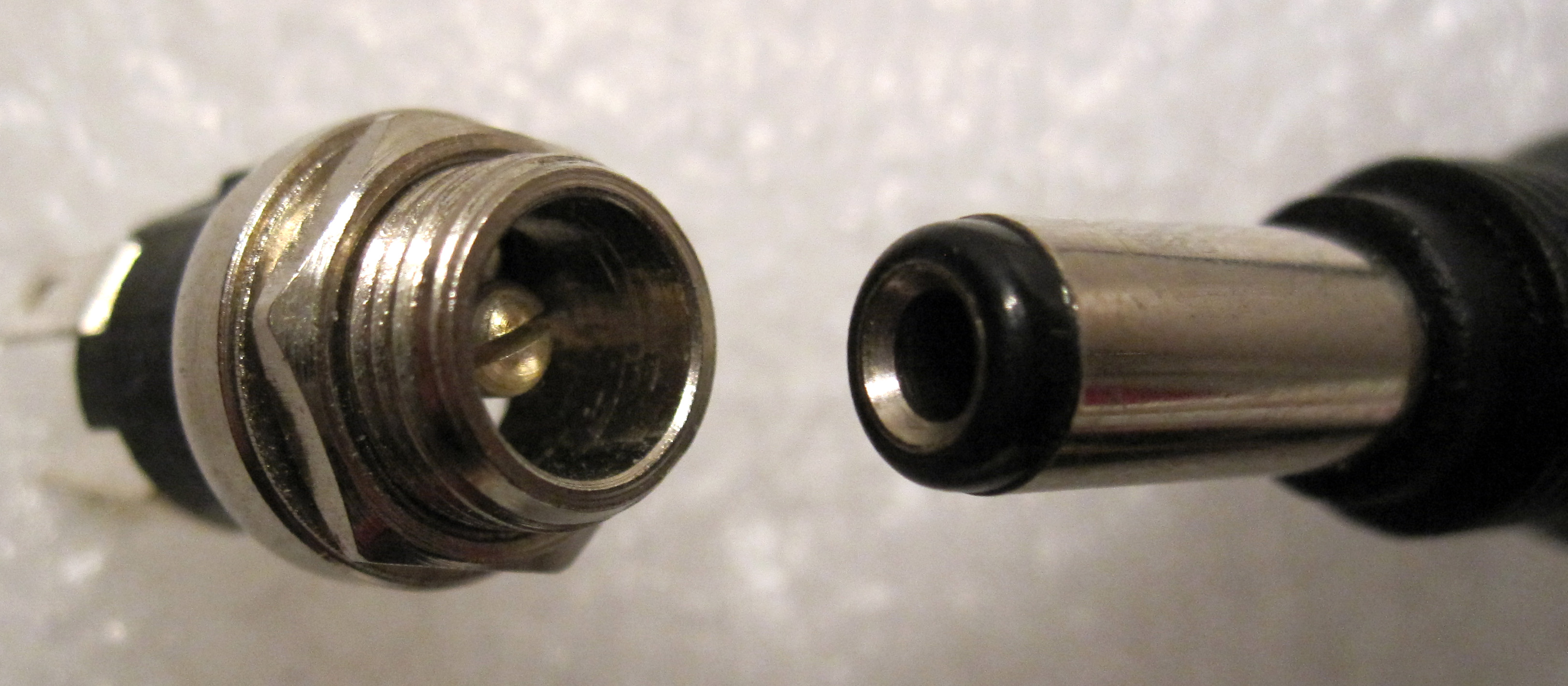
A common coaxial power connector, male (left) and female (right), 5.5 × 2.5 mm. The center contact determines the connector gender. Note: Connectors depicted do not connect.

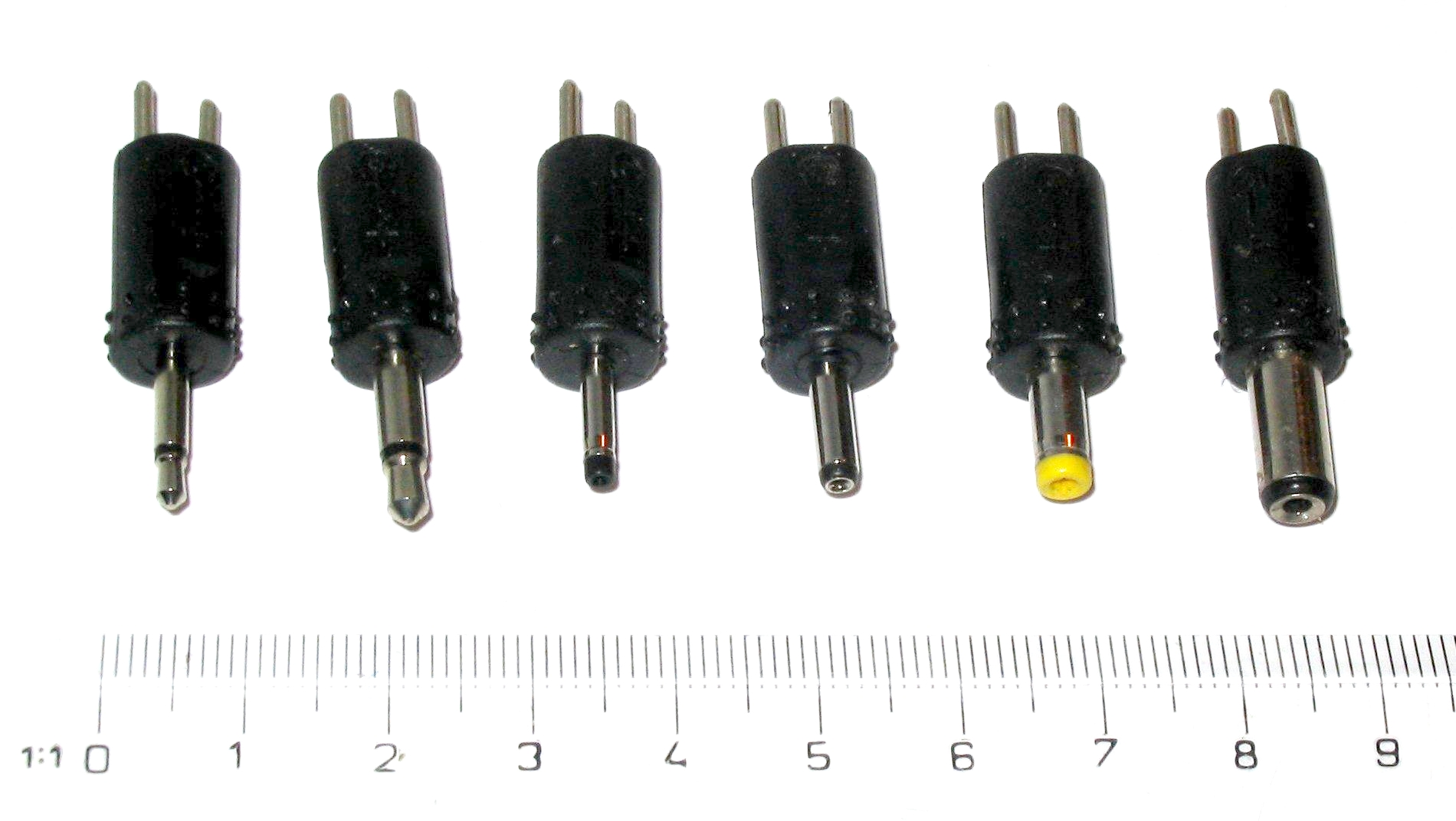
Common DC power connectors

A coaxial power connector is an electrical power connector used for attaching extra-low voltage devices such as consumer electronics to external electricity. Also known as barrel connectors, concentric barrel connectors or tip connectors, these small cylindrical connectors come in an enormous variety of sizes.

Barrel plug connectors are commonly used to interface the secondary side of a power supply with the device. Some of these jacks contain a normally closed switch; the switch can disconnect internal batteries whenever the external power supply is connected.

== Connector construction and terminology ==
The connector pairs for barrel connectors are defined in terms of "plugs" and "receptacles"; receptacles are more commonly called "sockets" or "jacks" in the United States. Receptacles may be panel-mounted or circuit board-mounted. Plugs are on cables. Some in-line receptacles are also cable-mounted.

Power is generally supplied by a plug to a receptacle. Cables are available with one in-line receptacle fanning out to several plugs, so that many devices may be supplied by one supply. As the use of a plug implies a cable, even a short stub, some power supplies carry panel-mounted receptacles instead to avoid this cable. Cables for such cases are available with a plug at each end, although cables or adapters with two receptacles are not widely available.

Female version of the coaxial connector plug

=== Plug (female) ===
A standard female coaxial plug consists of two concentric cylindrical metal contacts separated by an insulating layer that flares at the tip to prevent short circuits during insertion or removal. The exposed outer sleeve forms one contact, while the recessed inner sleeve is a hollow cylinder designed to accept the center pin of the mating socket.

In most applications, the outer sleeve serves as the ground (or negative) contact, while the inner terminal carries the positive supply voltage in a center-positive configuration, though center-negative polarity is also used in some devices.

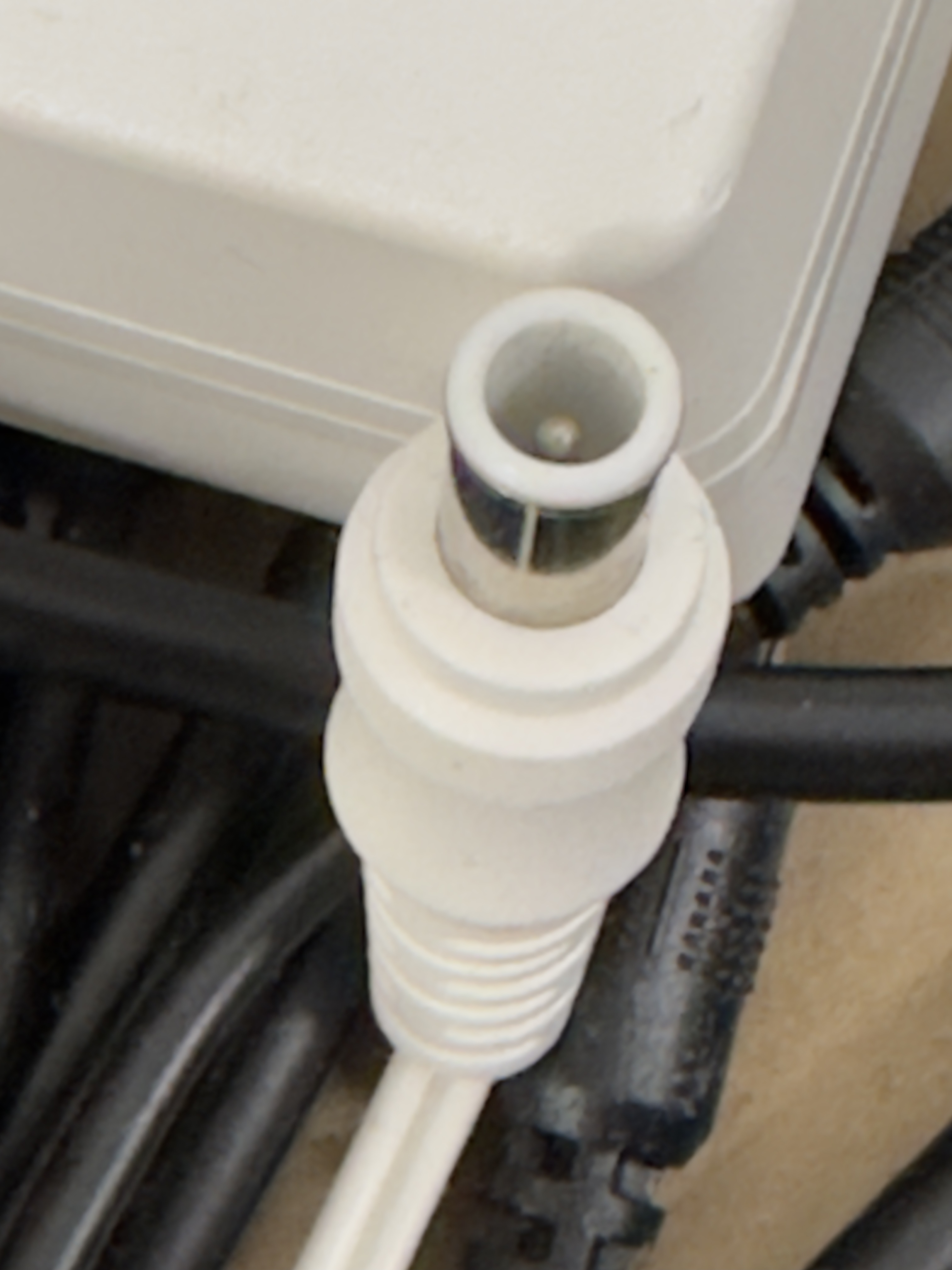
Male version of the coaxial connector plug

=== Plug (male) ===
This less common variant has the same cylindrical outer sleeve as the female plug, but replaces the hollow inner cylinder with a solid center pin.

=== Socket or receptacle ===
A socket designed for a female plug typically features a stationary center pin and a spring-loaded side contact that presses against the plug's outer sleeve. On the other hand, a socket designed for a male plug contains a hollow center sleeve (or cylindrical contact) to receive the plug's center pin.

While sockets are most commonly mounted directly on the circuit board or the equipment chassis, they are also manufactured as cable-mounted in-line sockets.

Common coaxial power socket mounting styles

PCB-mounted

Panel-mounted

Cable-mounted (in-line)

== Connector sizes ==
There are many different sizes of coaxial power connectors. See the table at the end of this article.

Contact ratings commonly vary from unspecified up to 5 A (11 A for special high-power versions). Voltage is often unspecified, but may be up to 48 V with 12 V typical. The smaller types usually have lower current and voltage ratings.

It is quite possible that new sizes will continue to appear and disappear. One possible reason that a particular manufacturer may use a new size is to discourage use of third-party power supplies, either for technical reasons or to force use of their own accessories, or both.

The sizes and shapes of connectors do not consistently correspond to the same power specifications across manufacturers and models. Two connectors from different manufacturers with different sizes could potentially be attached to power supplies with the same voltage and current. Alternatively, connectors of the same size can be part of power supplies with different voltages and currents. Use of the wrong power supply may cause severe equipment damage or even fire.

== Common sizes and interchangeability ==
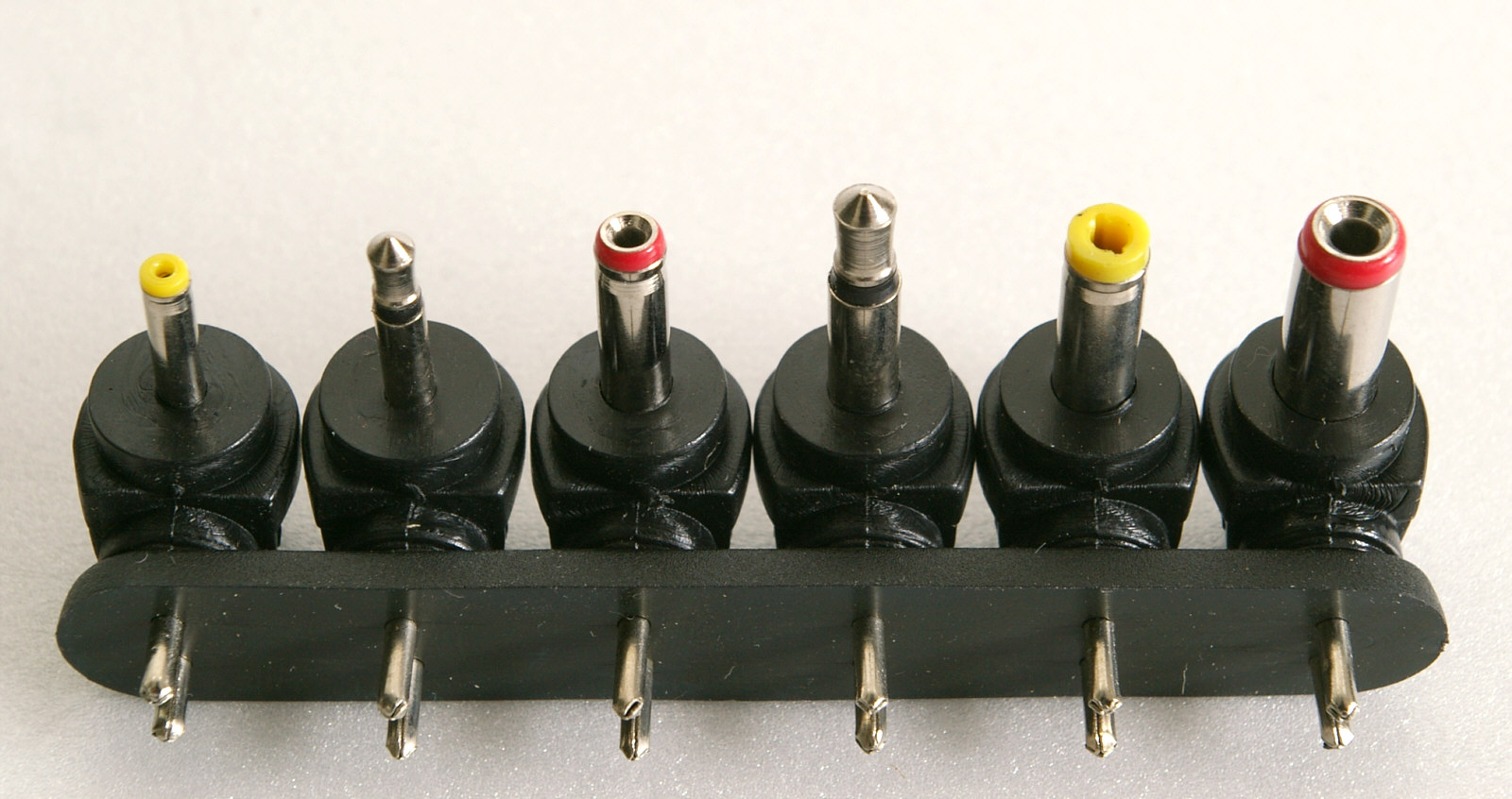
Some common DC power connectors

Generic plugs are often described by their inside diameter, such as 2.1 mm DC plugs. After the two common 5.5 mm OD (Outer Diameter) plugs, the next-most common size is 3.5 mm OD with a 1.3 mm ID (Inner Diameter), usually about 9.5 mm in length, although both longer and shorter versions also exist. These 3.5 mm OD plugs are normally used for lower voltages and currents.

== Locking and retention features ==
A ring-shaped "locking detent" or "high-retention feature", present on the barrel of some DC coaxial connectors, is a feature intended to prevent accidental disconnection. Typically, this feature is a conical cut-back section of the tip, just behind the insulator that separates the inner from the outer contact surfaces.

A "lock-ring DC coaxial connector" uses a captive threaded ring or collar to secure the connection between the plug and jack. This design offers strong resistance to unplugging when used properly.

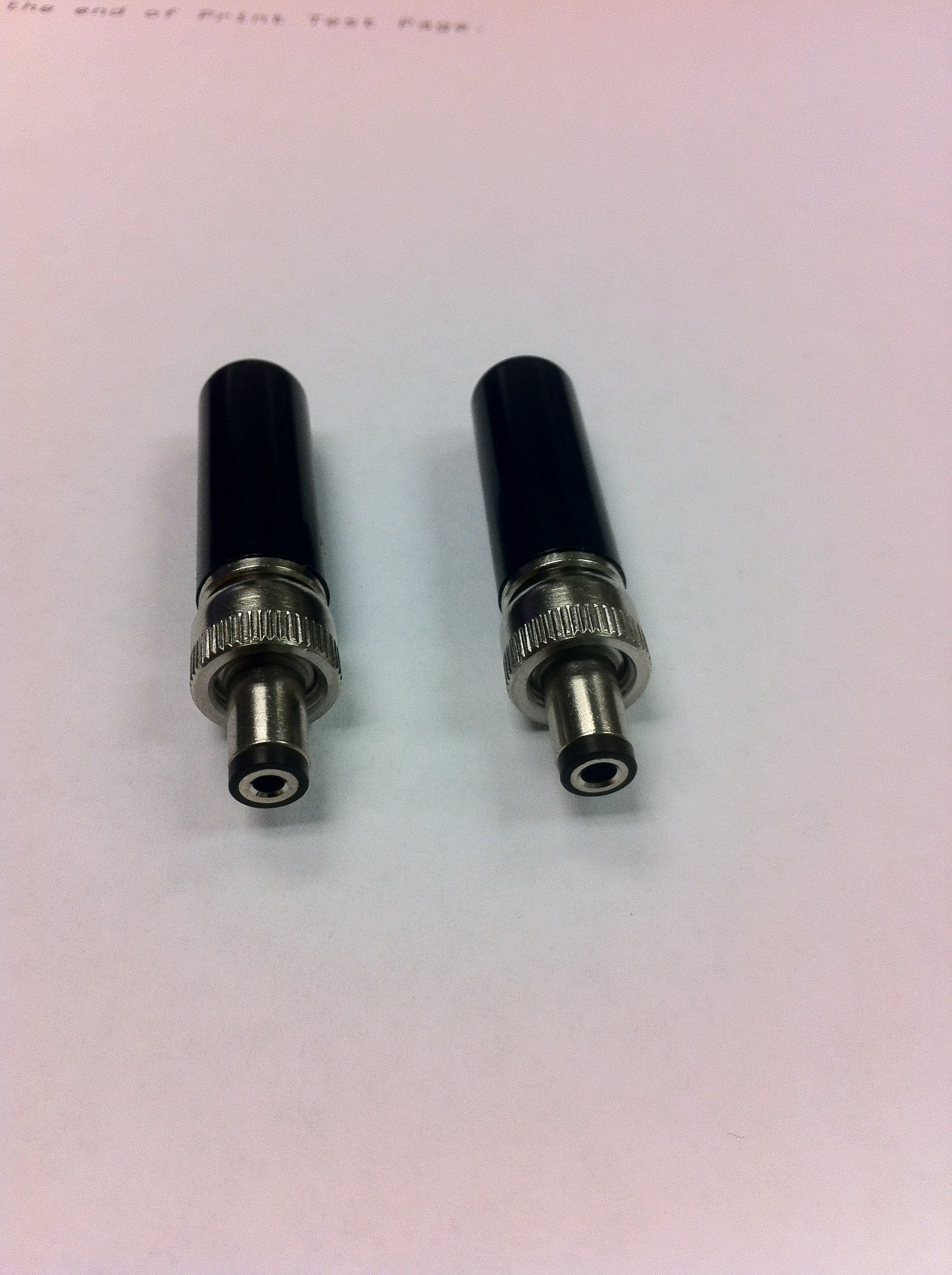
Lock-ring DC coaxial connectors. The knurled barrel allows the plug to be secured to jacks that have mating male threads.

A "lock-tab DC coaxial connector" (also called "bayonet lock") offers a compromise that resists unplugging, but which will disengage when pulled hard enough. This connector uses small metal tab protrusions on the connector barrel to lock the plug in place, requiring a special push-and-rotate motion to engage the locks.

== Standards ==
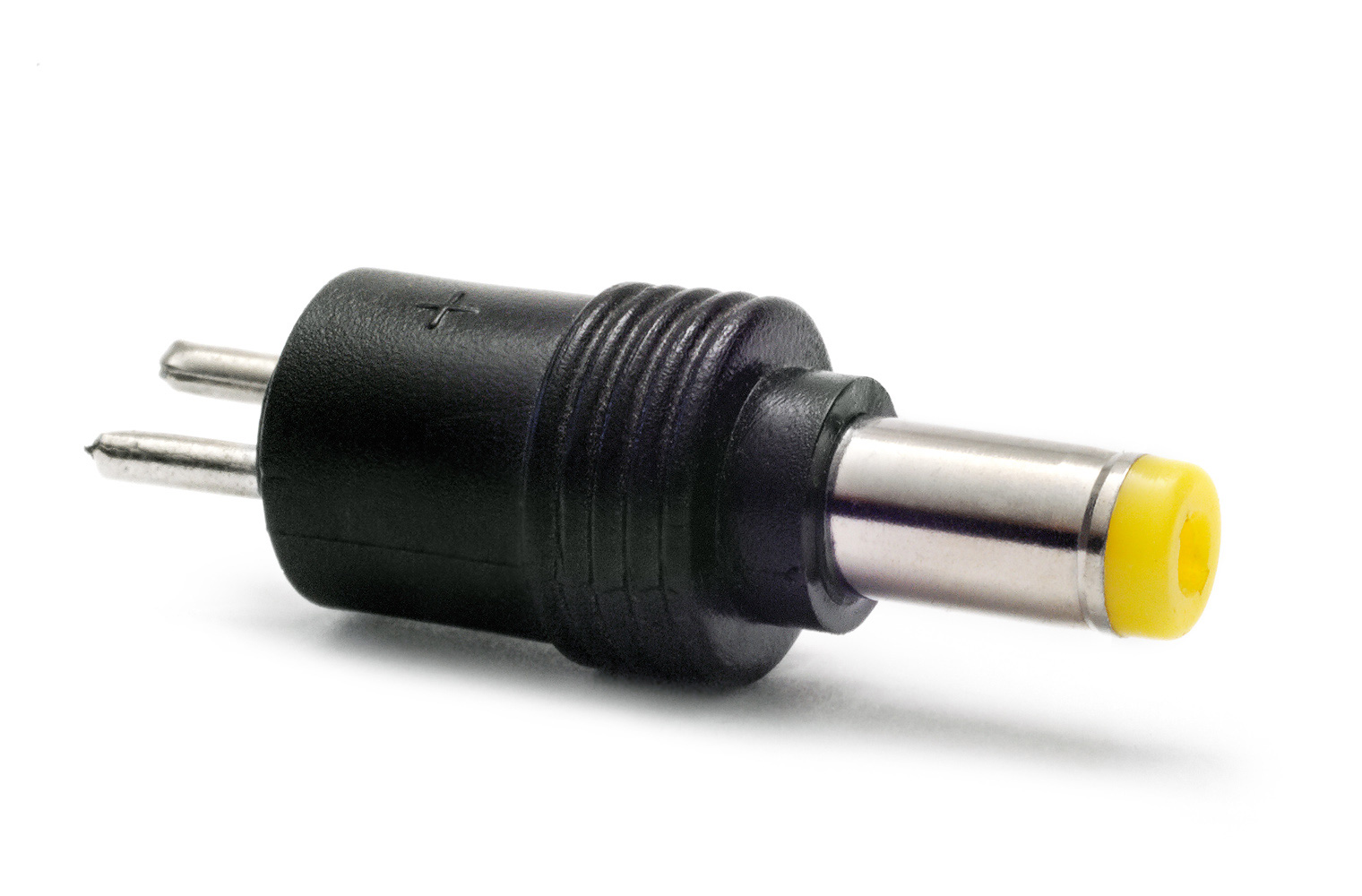
Close-up of a yellow-tipped EIAJ connector. Note two round adapter pins on the opposite end.

There are several standards in existence, provided by bodies such as the IEC, EIAJ in Japan and DIN in Germany. More recently, some manufacturers appear to have implemented their own system correlating voltage and plug size. In addition, there appears to be a trend to standardize DC connector to negative barrel (or sleeve) of a coaxial power connector.

=== IEC 60130-10 ===
International standard IEC 60130-10:1971 defines five DC power connectors:

- Type A: 5.5 mm OD, 2.1 mm ID (with optional screw lock)
- Type A: 5.5 mm OD, 2.5 mm ID (with optional screw lock)
- Type B: 6.0 mm OD, 2.1 mm ID
- Type B: 6.0 mm OD, 2.5 mm ID
- Type C: 3.8 mm OD, 1.1 mm ID
- Type D: 6.3 mm OD, 3.1 mm ID
- Type E: 3.4 mm OD, 1.3 mm ID

=== EIAJ power connector ===
The Japanese trade organization EIAJ issued EIAJ RC-5320A, which defines five plug and matching socket or jack sizes. Each of these plugs is used with a specified voltage range. Most manufacturers use colored insulating materials to distinguish these plugs from other similar-looking DC plugs, and for quick identification between EIAJ plugs of similar size.

- EIAJ-01: For 0–3.15 V. 2.5 mm OD, 0.7 mm ID.
- EIAJ-02: For 3.15–6.3 V. 4.0 mm OD, 1.7 mm ID.
- EIAJ-03: For 6.3–10.5 V. 5.0 mm OD, 1.7 mm ID.
- EIAJ-04 (also called JSBP 4): For 10.5–13.5 V. 5.5 mm OD, 3.4 mm ID.
- EIAJ-05 (also called JSBP 5): For 13.5–18 V. 6.5 mm OD, 4.4 mm ID.

EIAJ-04 and 05 have an internal male pin in the plug. The 01 through 03 sizes do not and are similar to the generic plugs in structure. These five EIAJ plugs are 9.5 mm in length and have a current rating of 2A.

There are two other, less common, connectors defined by EIAJ; RC-5321 and RC-5322. The latter is designed for both 12 V and 24 V automotive applications.

=== DIN 45323 ===
The German national standards organization DIN (Deutsches Institut für Normung—German Institute for Standardization) issued DIN 45323 in 1982 and since withdrawn, which defines two DC power plug and jack (respectively) sizes. At least one of these sizes has a maximum rating of 34 V and 3 A. The information here is inferred from catalog references, as the German standard has not been translated into English yet.

- 5.00 mm OD, 2.00 mm ID, 14 mm long?
- 6.00 mm OD, 1.98 mm ID

== Listing of DC coaxial connectors ==
This list attempts to show all known sizes, and is annotated with some manufacturers producing selected types, since each manufacturer makes its own unique subset of the known types. Note that the example part numbers given may have different connector barrel (sleeve) lengths, and are not necessarily exact equivalents. There are many more design variants than can be listed in this table, so only a small sampling of part numbers is given.

Connector size is often listed in the format OD (outer diameter) × ID (inner diameter) × L (length of barrel) and expressed in millimeters. Designations may vary between manufacturers.

Coaxial plugs that have a male center pin will have another measurement, Center Pin Diameter (CPD). These plugs are often used for higher power applications such as portable computers.

There are a number of sizes listed below that appear to be quite similar, and while the tolerances of these connectors are typically indicated as ±0.05 or ±0.03 mm by the manufacturers, there is still ambiguity as to whether two sizes differing by only 0.05 mm (or where the specification is only given to the nearest 0.10 mm) warrants listing them separately here.

OD (mm)	ID (mm)	CPD (mm)	Barrel length (mm)	Standard	Volts	Plug part numbers	Jack part numbers	Notes
2.00	0.60		6.3	Nokia 2-mm DC Charging Interface Specification	4.65–9.3 V	Nokia DC-096 (0.48×2.1 mm on socket side)	Nokia AC-3 charger	Nokia 2-mm DC Charging Interface, used in Nokia phones and Bluetooth headphones
2.35	0.70		9.5	EIAJ-01	0–3.15 V	Kobiconn 3218-EX; Lumberg 1636 01	Kobiconn 0307-EX (inline)	Canon ACK-800, also used on very old Motorola phones (SPN4364/4365/4366–4474)
2.40	0.70					Egston 212		possibly a rounded-off representation of EIAJ-01
2.40	0.80					Egston 213		
2.50	0.80							Used in Samsung Bluetooth headsets and few tablet PCs
3.00	1.00							
3.00	1.10					CUI Inc. PP-019; Egston 214	Nokia ACH-6E charger	Used in satellite radio docks and other devices. Acer, Samsung, Huawei chromebooks and/or laptops
3.20	0.90					CUI Inc. PP-017		
3.30	1.00						Motorola AAPN4064A	Used in older Motorola phones (SPN4680/4681/4682/4677/5296A) and also used in some rare Nokia phones (ACH-6)
3.40	1.30			IEC 60130-10 Type E		Kobiconn 3210-E	Kobiconn 0309-EX (inline)	
3.40	1.35					Egston 218 Medical, 220		
3.40	1.40					Lumberg NES/J 135		
3.50	0.90						Possible nokia acp-7 charger	Used in many older Nokia phones (ACP-12?)
3.50	1.10					CUI Inc. PP3–002C; Philmore 202		
3.50	1.30					Egston 238; Philmore 204,2049	Kobiconn 0308-EX (inline); Philmore 256 (inline)	Also used in older Alcatel phones (3DS07008A?AA, 3DS09371A?AA, 3DS10628A?AA)
3.50	1.35					CUI Inc. P7; CUI Inc. PP3–002D; Egston 215; Kobiconn PA35135-E		Also used for Canon CA-570 Charger (Output: 8.4V 2A)
3.60	1.15					Egston 216		
3.80	1.10					CUI Inc. P9 but with 1.05 mm ID		
3.80	1.20							Used in very rare Nokia phones (ACH-4)
3.80	1.30					Egston 217		
3.80	1.35					CUI Inc. P8		
3.80	1.40		9.0		12VDC @ 0.5A	Marushin Electric MP-138NK		Used in TP-Link Gigabit switch model TL-SG105(UN) Ver:6.0
4.00	1.70		9.5	EIAJ-02	3.15–6.3 V	Kobiconn 3219-EX; Lumberg 1636 02	Kobiconn 0311-EX (inline)	Used in Lenovo Flex 4 adapter Used for Sony PSP Charger (Input: 100-240VAC, Output: 5VDC @ 1500mA for PSP 1000, 2000, 3000)
4.5	3.0	0.5	12		19.5v			Newer HP and Dell laptop computers
4.75	1.70		9.5	EIAJ-03	6.3–10.5 V	Kobiconn 3220-EX; Lumberg 1636 03	Kobiconn 0310-EX (inline)	
4.75	?.??		2.5 protruding	EIAJ RC-5321				
5.00	1.50							
5.00	2.00			DIN 45323?		Egston 206,207,219		
5.00	2.10					CUI Inc. P3		
5.00	2.50					CUI Inc. P4		
5.50	1.50							
5.50	1.70							Used in Acer Aspire V5 adapter and some Hikvision 48V NVRs
5.50	2.10					CUI Inc. P5; CUI Inc. PP3–002A; Kobiconn 3217-EX; Philmore 210, 210L, 2109; Switchcraft 762, 763	CUI Inc. PR-002A (inline); Kobiconn 0302 (inline); Philmore 257 (inline); Switchcraft 721A (panel)	2.1 mm center pin Common on guitar effect pedals Arduino power adapter IEC 60130-10 Type A (first of two with same type and same OD, the other has ID of 2.5mm and center PIN)
5.50	2.10					CUI Inc. P10; Kobiconn 7391; Philmore 2560; Switchcraft 768K		2.1 mm center pin, lock-ring
5.50	2.10					Kobiconn 0721-EX	Kobiconn 1000-EX (panel)	2.1 mm center pin, lock-tab
5.50	2.50					CUI Inc. P6; CUI Inc. PP3–002B; Egston 222; Kobiconn 0702-EX; Philmore 250, 250L, 2509; Switchcraft 760, 765	CUI Inc. PR-002B (inline); Kobiconn 0303 (inline); Philmore 258 (inline); Switchcraft 712A (panel)	2.5 mm center pin used in Miniware TS100 soldering iron by e-Design; IEC 60130-10 Type A (second of two with same type and same OD, the other has ID of 2.1mm and no center PIN)
5.50	2.50					CUI Inc. P11; Kobiconn 7395; Philmore 2560; Switchcraft 760K		2.5 mm center pin, lock-ring
5.50	2.50					Kobiconn 0725-EX	Kobiconn 1100-EX (panel)	2.5 mm center pin, lock-tab
5.50	2.80							
5.50	3.0				5V, 1.5A, Efficiency Level V	Philmore Coaxial Power Plug 3.0mm I.D./5.5mm O.D. No. 206		Roku 2 XS HDTV Streaming Box
5.50	3.0	1.0						Samsung laptop computers (many), for instance 400B2B
5.50	3.30	1.00	9.5	EIAJ-04, JSBP4	10.5–13.5 V	Lumberg 1636 04		Microsoft Xbox 360 HD DVD drive
5.50	3.80	1.80						
6.00	1.98			DIN 45323		Lumberg 1632 01		
6.00	4.40	0.80?						found in an ISP specific modem/router, plug with male type, 12VDC power connector, manufactured by ARRIS, unknown standard, photo above in male connector example
6.30	2.50							found in an ISP specific modem/router, 12VDC power connector, manufactured by Compal, unknown standard
6.30	3.00					Icom R75, R8500		
6.50	?.??			EIAJ RC-5322				
6.50	3.00							Used in Yamaha and Casio keyboard power supply
6.50	3.10	1.00				Philmore 285		
6.50	3.40	1.40	9.0		18 VDC @5A	Kobiconn 6014-E		used often for laptop computers
6.50	4.10	1.00		JEITA RC-5322	24 VDC @ 2A	Lumberg 1636 06		Epson Photo Scanners V600, etc.
6.50	4.30	1.40		EIAJ-05, JSBP5	13.5–18.0 V	Lumberg 1636 05; Philmore 265; CUI Inc. PP-016	Philmore 214; CUI Inc. PJ-025	OD is of ring at tip Common for Sony laptop computers and scanning radios
6.90	4.20	0.70						
7.00	??	1.00				Philmore 48-412		
7.4	5.1		12.5					Mini-ITX motherboards, e.g., Intel DH61AG, Asus H310T
7.4	5.5	0.5	12.5					Some Asus, Dell, HP, Sony laptop computers; Dyson hand-held vacuum cleaners
8.0	5.5	1.5	8		36V-42V @ 3A			Lime gen 2.5/3 electric scooters
8.0	5.5	1.5 (?)	10.5		42V 2A			ES2 and M365 electric scooters & Goal Zero Solar devices (Sherpa & Yeti). IBM Lenovo laptop computer PSUs
8.3	3.2		4	RCA Cinch	36-54V	Samesky RCP-02	Samesky RCJ-03	E-Bike batteries
9.0	5.5	1.0 (?)	10.5		?V 2A			Goal Zero Solar device Chaining cable (Sherpa only)

== See also ==
- AC adapter
- Anderson Powerpole
- Cigarette lighter receptacle
- DC connector
- Gender of connectors and fasteners
