= 2N696 =

First silicon transistors of 1958

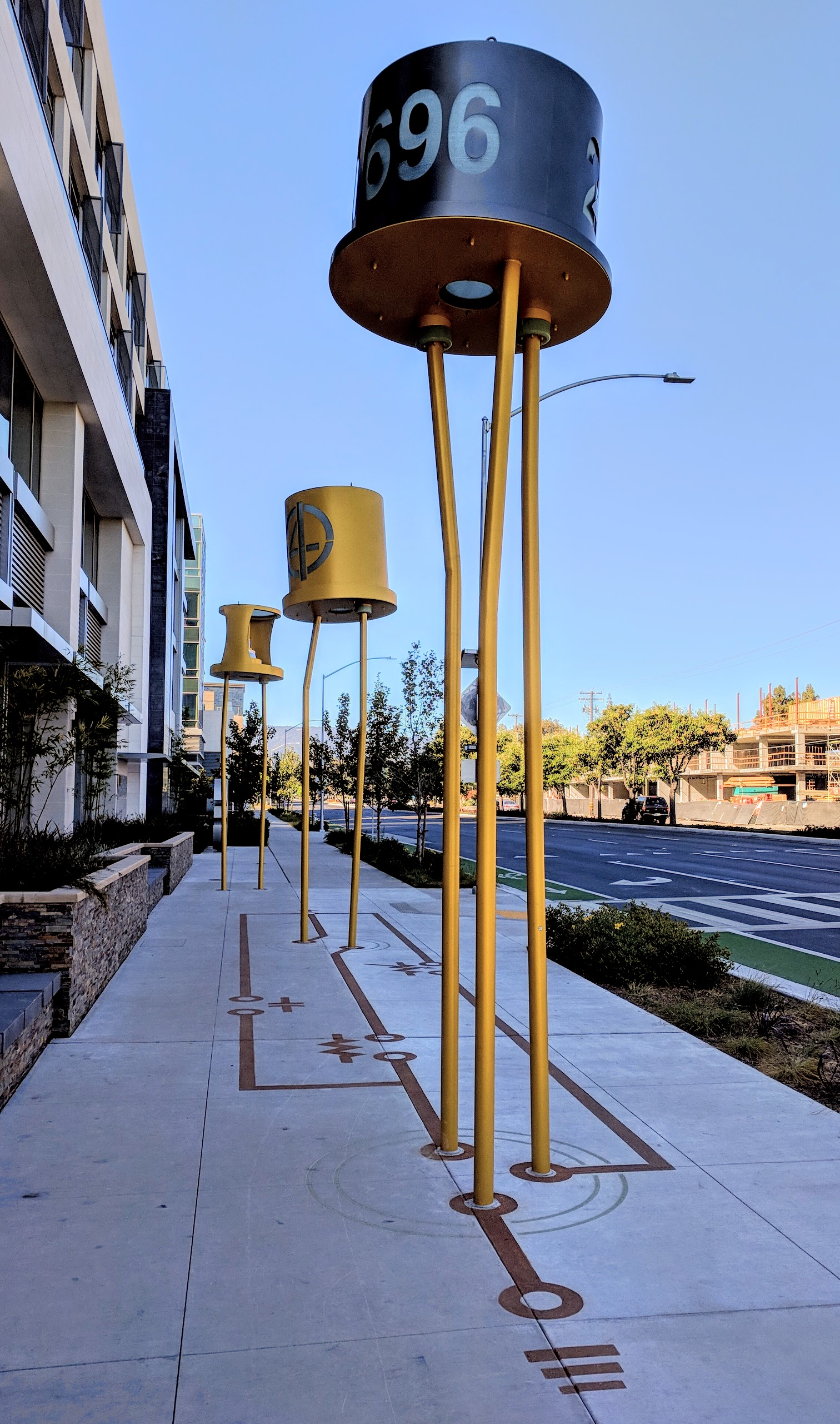
The site of the original Shockley Semiconductor Laboratory features a sidewalk sculpture of a circuit that includes a Shockley diode and a 2N696 transistor, even though the 2N696 was made by the traitorous eight who defected from Shockley to start Fairchild Semiconductor.

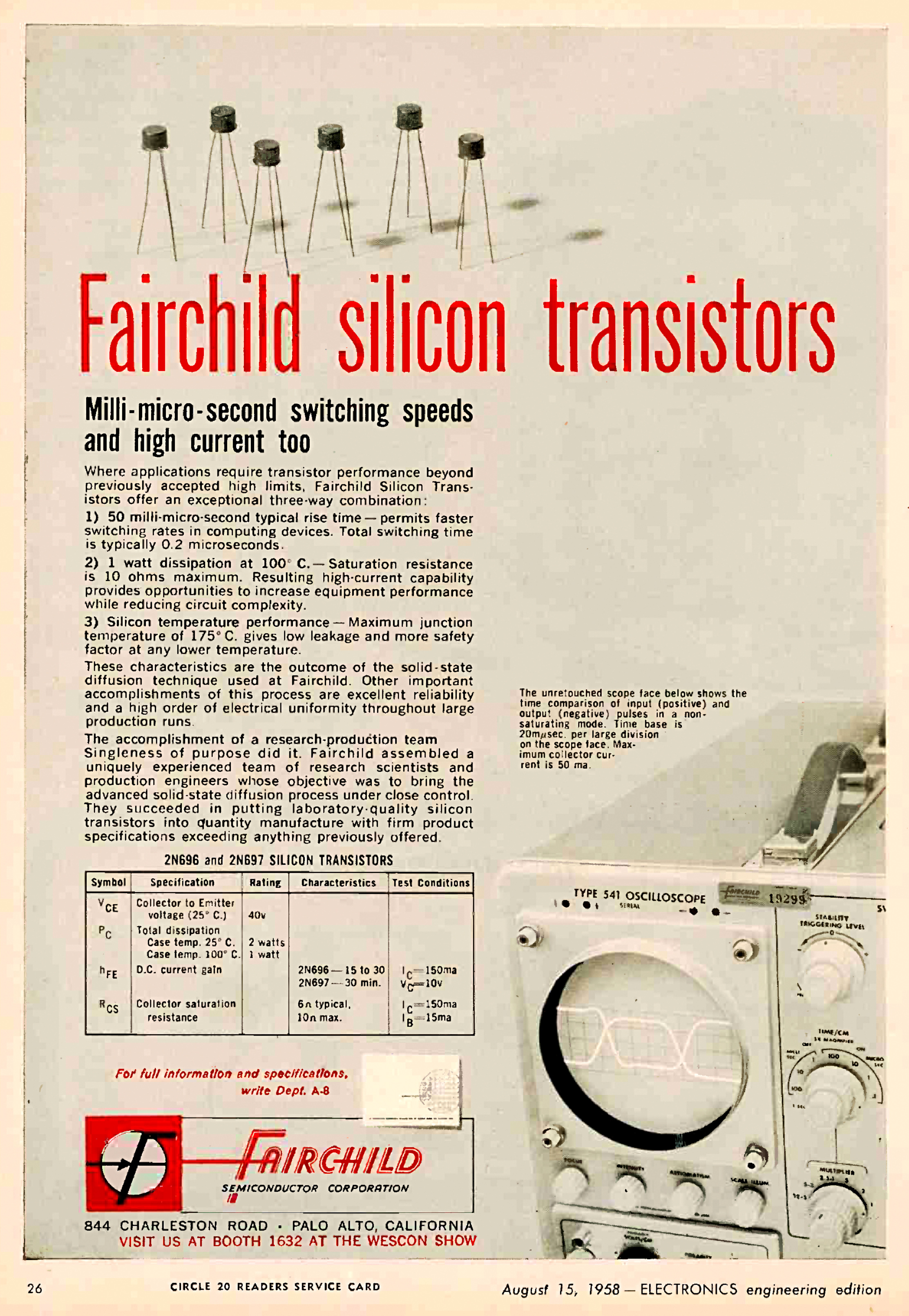
The first advertisement of a silicon transistor made in Silicon Valley, by Fairchild Semiconductor in 1958. The ad appeared in various publications; this scan is from Electronics, August 15, 1958. The 2N696 and 2N697 transistors described differ only in their current gain (2N696 15 to 30, 2N697 30 or higher).

The 2N696 and 2N697 were the first silicon transistors manufactured in Silicon Valley, in 1958, by Fairchild Semiconductor. Fairchild introduced itself to the world via its advertisements for these transistors, which were identical except for a post-manufacturing binning on current gain.

The 2N696/2N697 NPN mesa transistor was developed by a team led by Gordon Moore. The first batch of 100 was sold to IBM for $150 each (equivalent to $1,635 in 2024) in order to build the computer for the B-70 bomber. More transistors were sold to Autonetics to build the guidance system for the Minuteman ballistic missile.

The 2N696 and 2N697 were popular devices, quickly copied by several other semiconductor companies, including Texas Instruments, Rheem Semiconductor, and others including Hoffman Electronics Corp. and Industro Transistor Corp. In a 1960 advertisement, Fairchild bragged, "The Fairchild 2N696 and 2N697 are the world's most copied transistors. We have now copied them ourselves in scaled down versions. The 2N717 and 2N718 are exactly the same as these popular types but packaged in the TO-18 case. They occupy 1/3 the volume of the standard TO-5, making them ideal for high-density equipment designs."
