= New Media Corporation =

American computer company

- Type: Private
- Industry: Computers
- Founded: March 1992; 34 years ago
- Founders: Carl Perkins; Rod Corder; Eric McAfee
- Defunct: 2003; 23 years ago
- Fate: Dissolution
- Products: PC Cards
- Number of employees: 140 (1995, peak)

New Media Corporation, also known as New Media Technology Corporation, was an American computer company active from 1992 to the early 2000s. The company focused on the design and manufacture of PC Cards, a type of expansion card bus for laptops that had their heyday from the early 1990s to the mid-2000s. New Media was privately held and based out of Irvine, California.

== History ==
=== Foundation (1992–1994) ===
New Media Corporation was founded by Carl Perkins, Rod Corder, and Eric McAfee, in Irvine, California, in March 1992. Perkins and Corder had previously worked together in the early 1980s at Rockwell Semiconductor Systems (which later changed their name to Conexant) of Newport Beach, California, where both led a team of chip designers within the company. In 1989, they founded Togai InfraLogic with another business partner. Togai InfraLogic was founded to capitalize on their ideas on designs for math coprocessor chips that each had developed in their spare time. The company later sold a Japanese speech recognition ASIC to Canon. In 1990, Perkins and Corder left Togai InfraLogic over differences of expectations for the company's future with the third business partner. Perkins and Corder both ended up at the information products division of ITT Inc., designing ASICs for use in expansion card products for personal computers. It was in this capacity that the two got the inspiration to found New Media Corporation. The duo had been observing the fledgling PC Card expansion bus standard for laptops in the early 1990s and believed they could design PC Card products that were both plug-and-play and intuitive to configure. In 1991, they discovered Eric McAfee, an investor of Silicon Beach technology companies, through a mutual friend and decided to hire him as chief financial officer (CFO).

New Media was the first company to manufacture PC Cards in the United States, according to the Orange County Business Journal. Within a year of its existence it gained large laptop manufacturers such as Toshiba, Hewlett-Packard, and Compaq as clients, manufacturing DRAM-based memory expansion cards on an OEM basis and becoming a major player in the PC Card field. With these clients, New Media designed and manufactured the cards for them to rebadge and provide as private-label optional peripherals for their respective users. The company earned $8.5 million in sales within its first year. Later in 1992, New Media began selling their own PC Cards to resellers and retailers. In December 1992, the company introduced the PalmModem, a modem intended for Hewlett-Packard's 95LX palmtop computer; although it supported other laptops and subnotebooks, it came with software and device drivers optimized for the HP 95LX's internal hardware. The PalmModem sold in high numbers and gave New Media further industry recognition. The company soon attracted customers such as AST Research, Gateway 2000, NEC, and Zeos, and between November 1993 and October 1994, New Media grew from 54 workers to over 100.

The company by late 1993 included in its catalog PC Card not only modems and DRAM cards but also sound cards, SCSI host adapters, Ethernet adapters, wireless DSSS network adapters, and more. By the end of 1993, New Media posted annual sales of $40 million. The company began majorly expanding its retail distribution by offering their hardware at wholesale clubs like Costco and big-box stores like Walmart, after hiring Michael P. Halloran in June 1994. By the middle of 1994, New Media was producing 25,000 cards per month.

=== AMP stake and decline (1994–2003) ===
New Media's steady growth attracted the attention of AMP Incorporated, a major manufacturer of electronic connectors based in Pennsylvania, who invested $6.5 million in the company in exchange for a 10-percent stake in May 1993. AMP's minority interest soon grew to a controlling 25-percent stake with the infusion of another $9 million in 1994, allowing the company to appoint directors at will. In early 1995, AMP orchestrated the ouster of McAfee, then the company's CFO, leaving Perkin and Corder as the sole co-founders of the company left, as CEO and vice president of engineering respectively. McAfee soon after sued New Media for wrongful termination, with Perkins tasked with supervising this lawsuit. Perkins later resigned as CEO in September 1995 but stayed within the company's legal department.

By 1995 New Media held 10 percent of the total PC Card market, competing against larger companies such as Practical Peripherals, Xircom, and 3Com. Employment at the company peaked at 140 workers that year. They began to lag behind the PC Card modem market with respect to maximum bit rates of their newest products by late 1995. This combined with having to deal with two separate lawsuits (one issued by themselves against an Orange County competitor they accused of industrial espionage in poaching their workers) compelled management to either sell off the company to the highest bidder or to arrange for the company to go public. In December 1995, 10 percent of New Media's 140 workers were laid off, this layoff chiefly affecting second shifters whose jobs were lost to increased production efficiency.

New Media's situation had simmered by the turn of the millennium, with neither action being taken and the company remaining private. The company was rocked with another lawsuit, by General Patent Corporation for alleged patent infringements (General Patent simultaneously launched suits against several other modem manufacturers, including IBM and USRobotics) in July 1997. This was resolved a year later, after the two parties reached an out-of-court settlement in which General Patent obtained an equity stake in New Media. The company had stabilized at roughly 30 workers between 1998 and 2000. It formally dissolved in 2003, around the same time the ExpressCard bus standard was formalized, which soon obsoleted the PC Card standard.
