= TO-5 =

Standardized metal semiconductor package

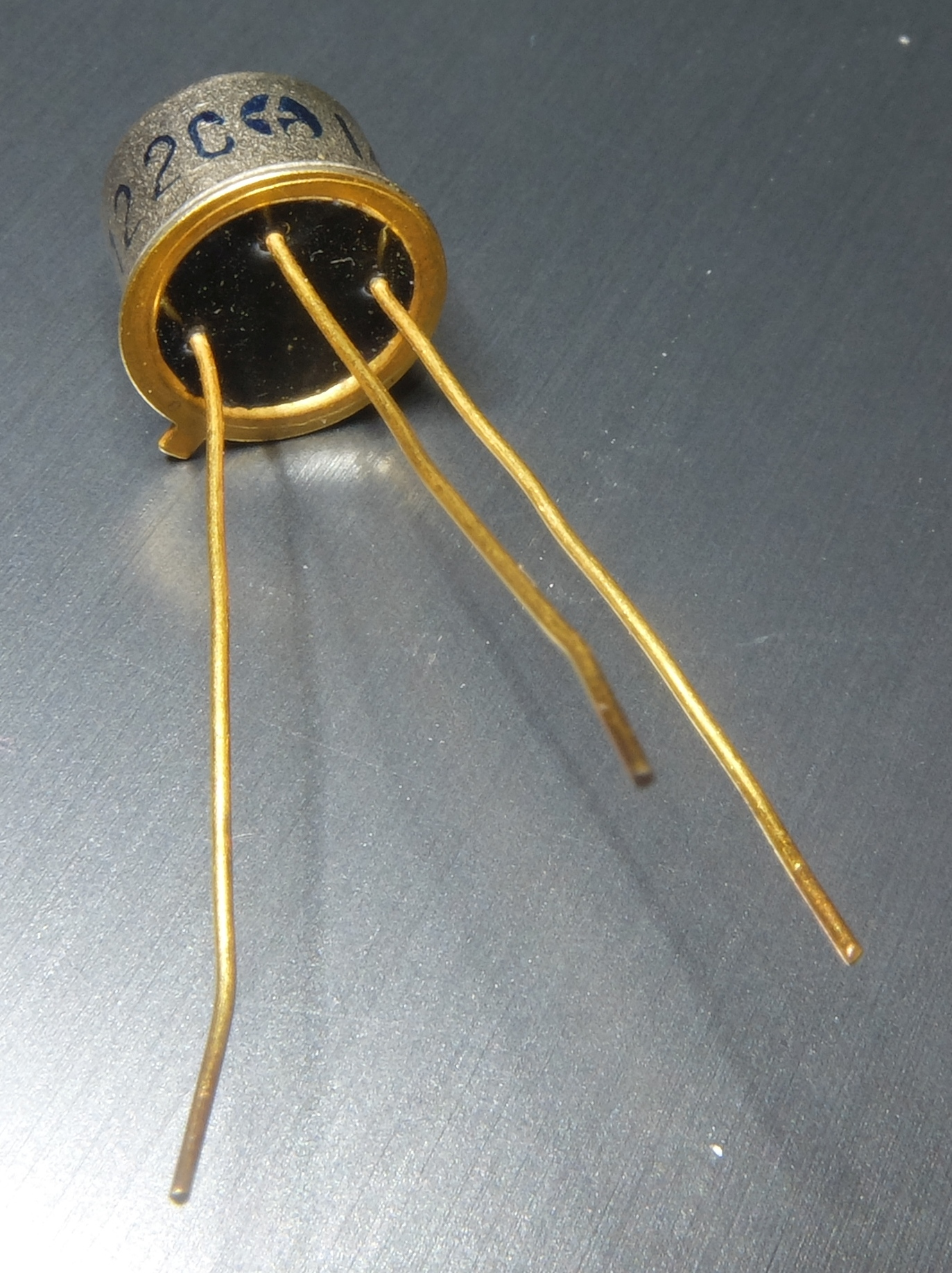
Transistor in a TO-5 package with 25 mm leads.

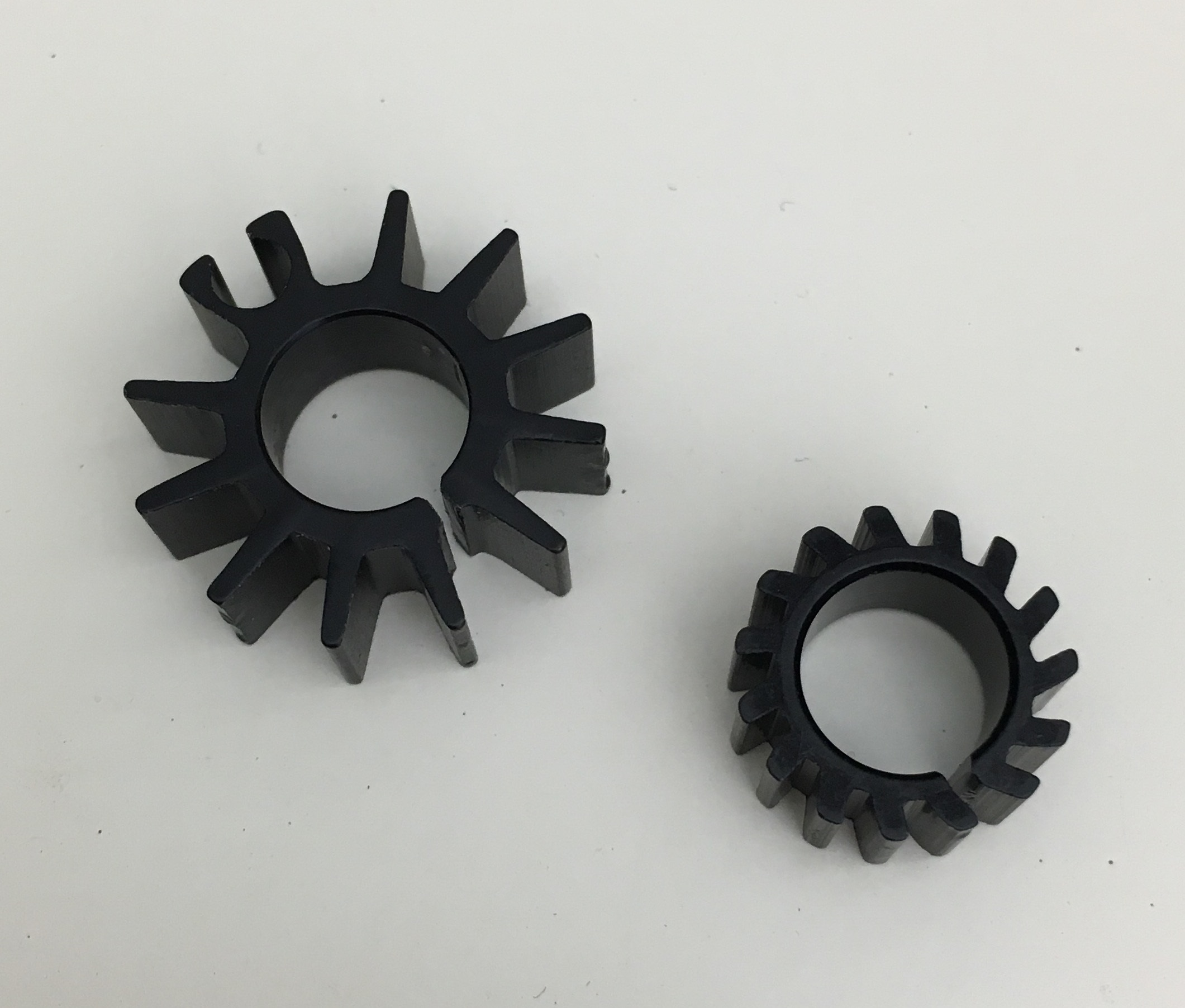
Gear-shaped heat sinks for TO-5 packages.

In electronics, TO-5 (Transistor Outline 5) is a designation for a standardized metal semiconductor package used for transistors and some integrated circuits. The TO element stands for "transistor outline" and refers to a series of technical drawings produced by JEDEC. The first commercial silicon transistors, the 2N696 and 2N697 from Fairchild Semiconductor, came in a TO-5 package.

== Construction and orientation ==
The tab is located 45° from pin 1, which is typically the emitter. The typical TO-5 package has a base diameter of 8.9 mm (0.35 in), a cap diameter of 8.1 mm (0.32 in), a cap height of 6.3 mm (0.25 in). The pins are isolated from the package by individual glass-metal seals, or by a single resin potting. Sometimes one pin is connected directly to the metal case.

== Variants ==
Several variants of the original TO-5 package have the same cap dimensions but differ in the number and length of the leads (wires). Somewhat incorrectly, TO-5 and TO-39 are often used in manufacturer's literature as synonyms for any package with the cap dimensions of TO-5, regardless of the number of leads, or even for any package with the diameter of TO-5, regardless of the cap height and the number of leads. Compared to TO-5, for the other variants (except TO-33 and TO-42) the minimum length of the leads was shortened from 38.1 mm (1.50 in) to 12.7 mm (0.50 in) which is sufficient for through-hole technology and leads to a cost reduction, whereas the longer leads were needed for point-to-point construction. Lead lengths of 25.4 mm (1.00 in) and 19.05 mm (0.750 in) are quite common but were not standardized separately by JEDEC. There are variants with between 2 and 12 leads. The leads are arranged in a circle with a diameter of 5.08 mm (0.200 in) (except TO-96, TO-97, TO-100, TO-101). Before the introduction of dual in-line packages in 1965, integrated circuits were packaged mostly in metal can packages such as the TO-5 variants with more than 3 leads.

=== TO-39 / TO-9 / TO-16 / TO-42 ===
The TO-39, TO-9, and TO-16 packages have 3 leads and differ in the shortened leads mentioned above from TO-5. Additionally, the TO-9 and TO-16 packages do not have a tab. The TO-42 package is almost identical to the TO-5 package (including the long leads) but has four stand-offs at the bottom of the base that keep the base about 0.5 mm above the circuit board. Possibly the TO-16 and TO-42 designations were not actually used.

=== TO-12 / TO-33 ===
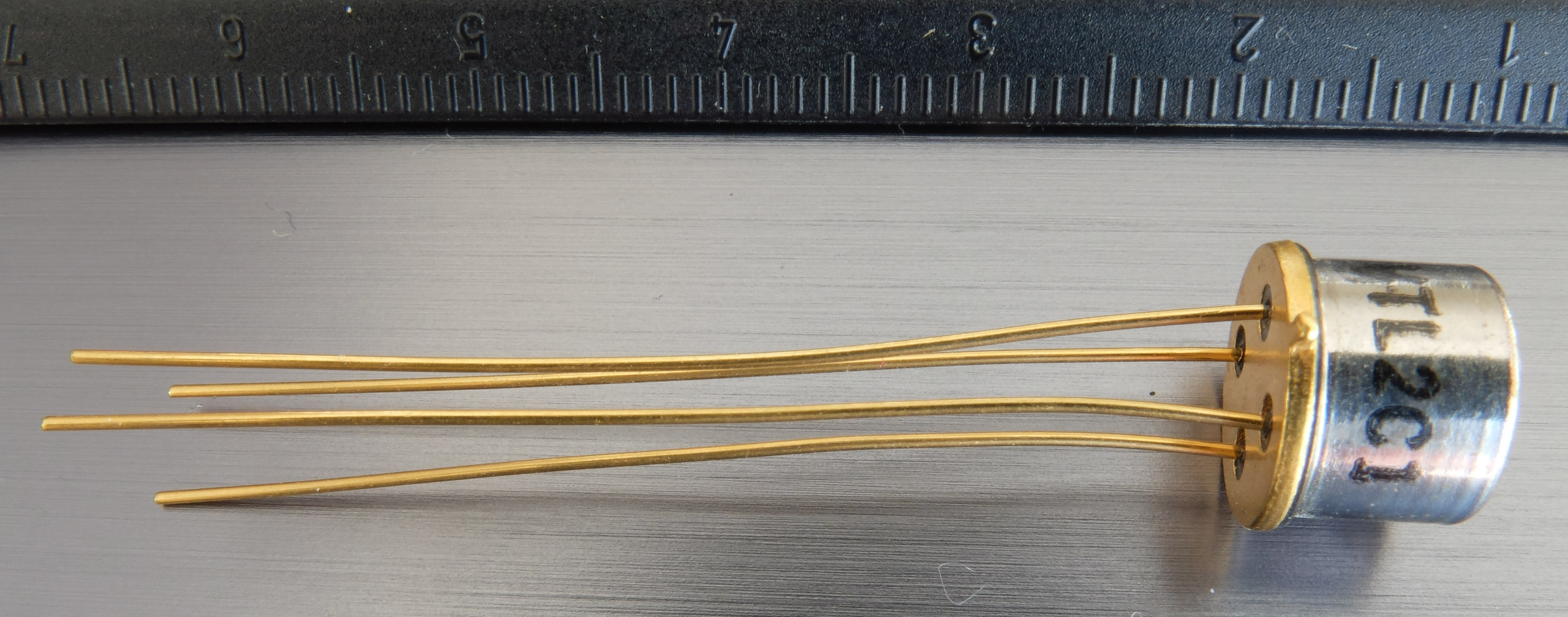
Resistive opto-isolator VTL2C1 in a TO-33 package

The TO-12 and TO-33 packages have 4 leads. TO-33 has 38.1 mm (1.50 in) leads like TO-5 while TO-12 has 12.7 mm (0.50 in) leads. For transistors, the fourth wire is typically connected to the metal case as a means of electromagnetic shielding for radio frequency applications.

=== TO-75 ===
The TO-75 package has 6 leads (at most one of those may be omitted). The minimum angle between two adjacent leads is 60°.

=== TO-76 / TO-77 ===
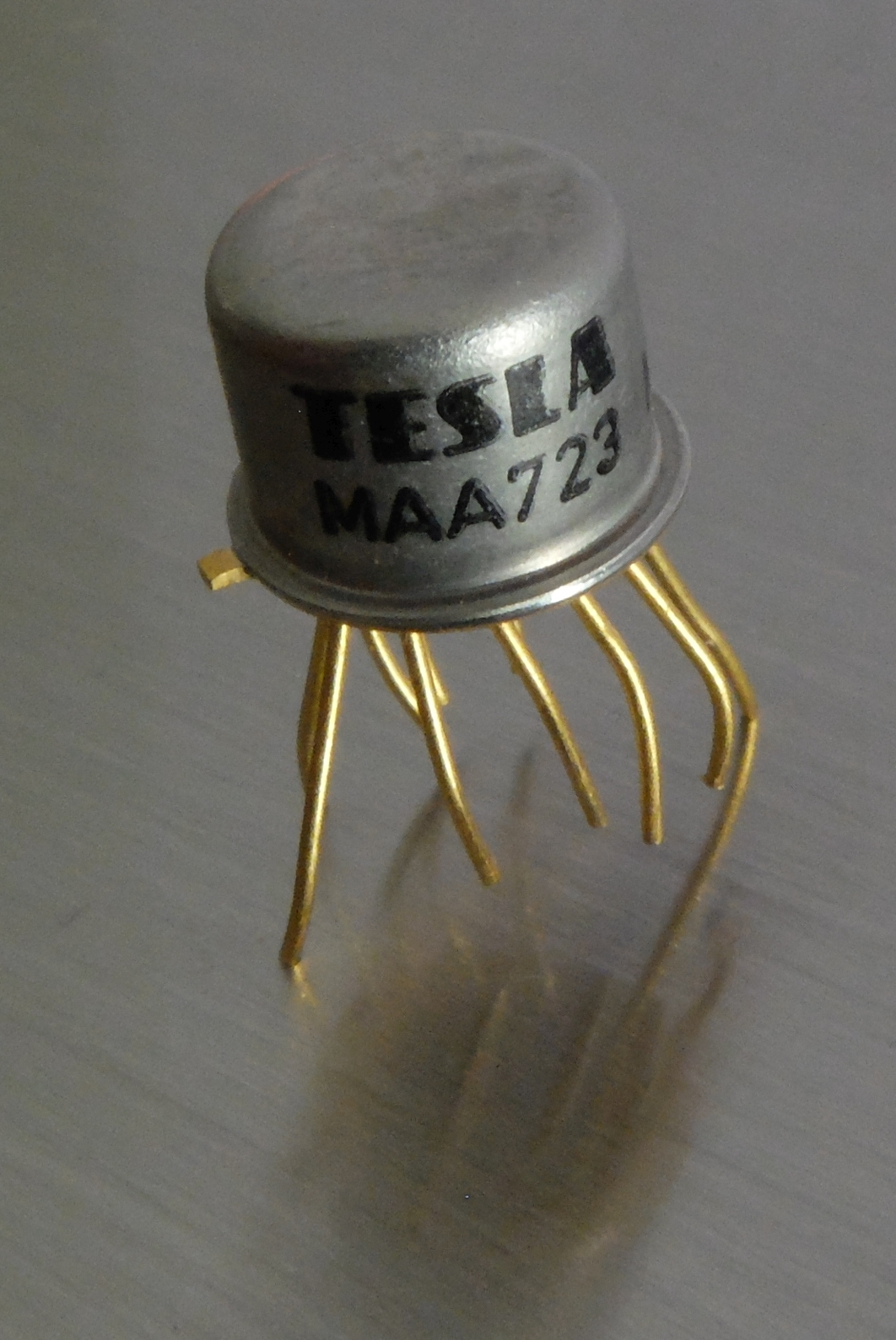
Voltage regulator integrated circuit (Tesla MAA723) in a TO-76 package.

The TO-76 and TO-77 packages have 8 leads (up to three of those may be omitted). The minimum angle between two adjacent leads is 45°. The TO-77 package differs from the TO-76 package only in that the bottom of a TO-77 package can sit directly on a circuit board whereas the TO-76 package requires a distance of up to 1.02 mm (0.040 in) between circuit board and package.

=== TO-78 / TO-79 / TO-80 / TO-99 ===
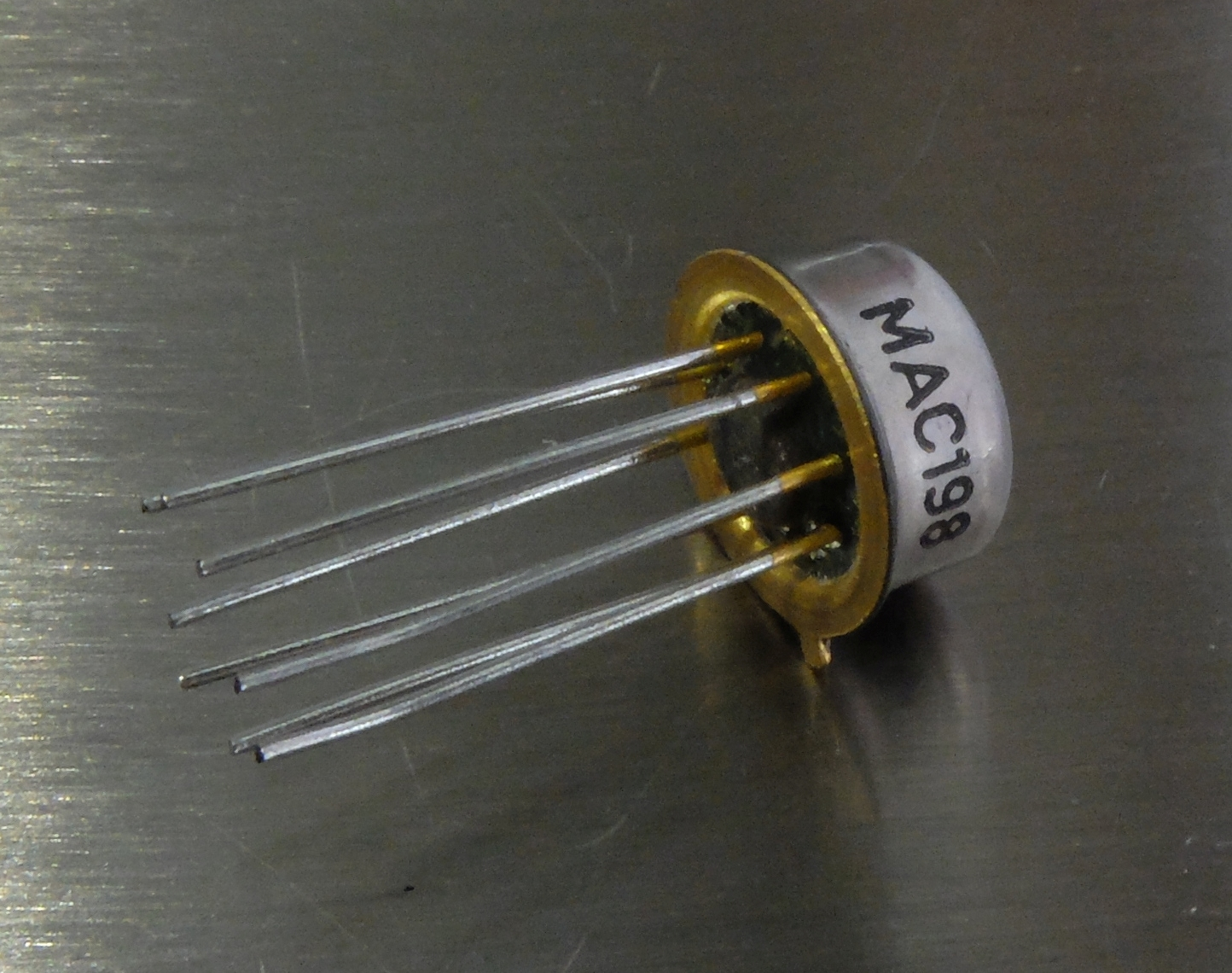
Sample-and-hold integrated circuit (Tesla MAC198) in a reduced-height TO-99 package.

The TO-78, TO-79, TO-80, and TO-99 packages have 8 leads (up to three of those may be omitted). The minimum angle between two adjacent leads is 45°. These packages differ from other variants in the height of the cap. Instead of 6.3 mm (0.25 in) the cap height is only 4.45 mm (0.175 in) for TO-78 / TO-99, 3.81 mm (0.150 in) for TO-79, and 2.41 mm (0.095 in) for TO-80. The TO-78 package differs from the TO-99 package only in that the bottom of a TO-78 package can sit directly on a circuit board whereas the TO-99 package requires a distance of up to 1.02 mm (0.040 in) between circuit board and package.

=== TO-74 ===
The TO-74 package has 10 leads (at most one of those may be omitted). The minimum angle between two adjacent leads is 36°.

=== TO-96 / TO-97 / TO-100 ===
The TO-96, TO-97, and TO-100 packages have 10 leads (at most one of those may be omitted). The minimum angle between two adjacent leads is 36°. For these packages the diameter of the circle of leads is increased from 5.08 mm (0.200 in) to 5.84 mm (0.230 in). This allows a slightly increased chip area in a cap of unchanged diameter. TO-96 has the standard cap height of 6.3 mm (0.25 in), while TO-100 and TO-97 have reduced cap heights of 4.45 mm (0.175 in) (like TO-78) and 3.81 mm (0.150 in) (like TO-79), respectively.

=== TO-73 ===
The TO-73 package has 12 leads (at most one of those may be omitted). The minimum angle between two adjacent leads is 30°.

=== TO-101 ===
The TO-101 package has 12 leads (at most one of those may be omitted). The minimum angle between two adjacent leads is 30°. For this package the diameter of the circle of leads is increased from 5.08 mm (0.200 in) to 5.84 mm (0.230 in). This allows a slightly increased chip area in a cap of unchanged diameter. TO-101 has a reduced cap height of 4.45 mm (0.175 in) (like TO-78).

=== TO-205 ===
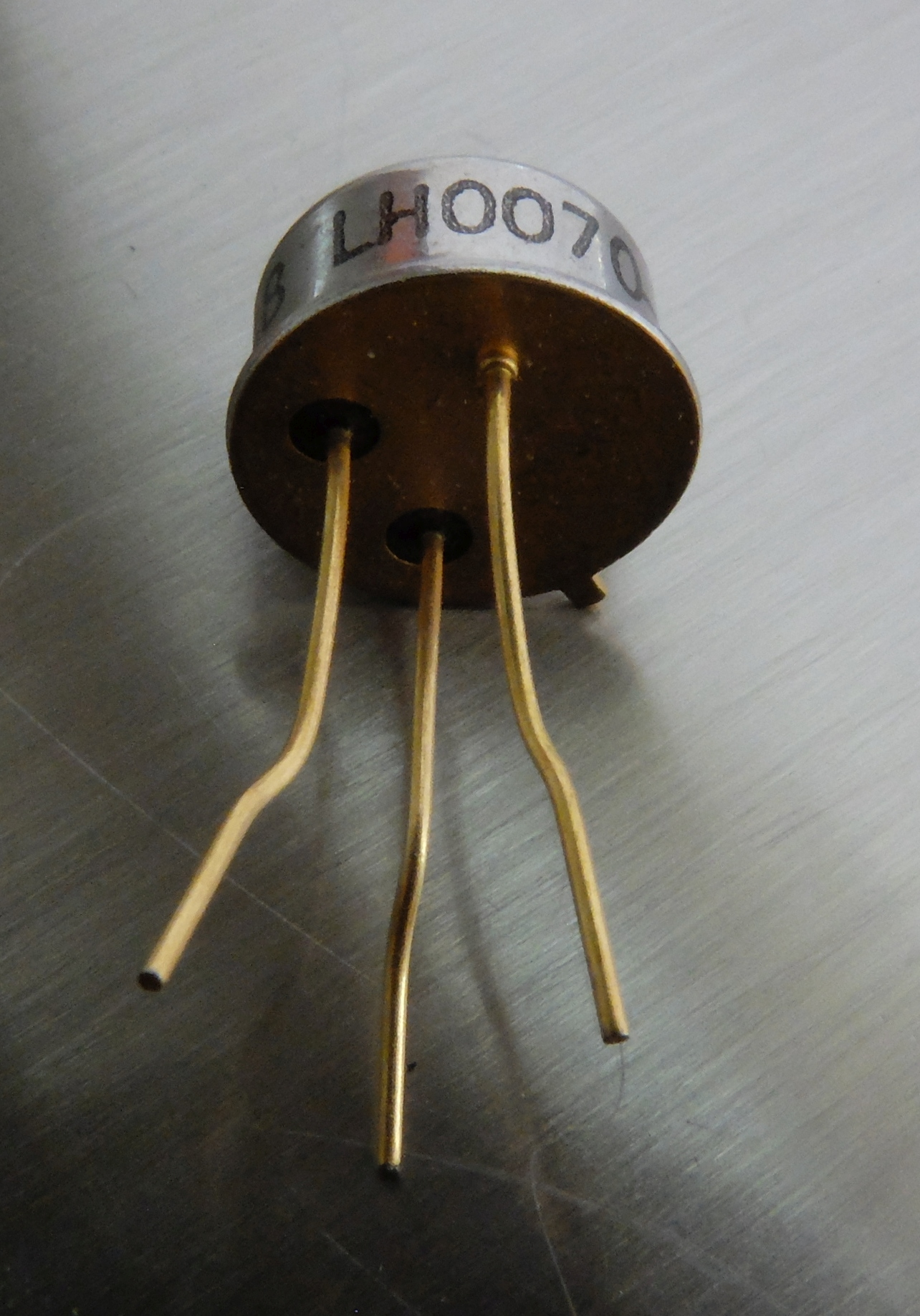
Voltage reference integrated circuit (National Semiconductor LH0070) in a TO-205-AF package

TO-205 is intended to replace previous definitions of packages with leads arranged in a circle with a diameter of 5.08 mm (0.200 in). The different outlines are now defined as variants of TO-205: TO-5 is renamed to TO-205-AA, TO-12 to TO-205-AB, TO-33 to TO-205-AC, TO-39 to TO-205-AD. A new package with 3 leads and a cap height of 4.32 mm (0.170 in) (similar to TO-78 / TO-99) is added as TO-205-AF.

== National Standards ==
Standards organization	Standard	Designation for				
Standards organization	Standard	TO-5	TO-12	TO-33	TO-39	TO-77
JEDEC	JEP95	TO-205-AA	TO-205-AB	TO-205-AC	TO-205-AD	—
IEC	IEC 60191 (Note: These standards have separate drawings for the package case and the base.)	C4/B4A	C4/B6C	C4/B6A	C4/B4C	C4/B7C
DIN	DIN 41873	5A3	5C4	5A4	5C3	5C8
EIAJ / JEITA	ED-7500A	TC5/TB-5A	TC5/TB-14C	TC5/TB-14A	TC5/TB-5C	TC5/TB-15C
British Standards	BS 3934	SO-3/SB3-3A	SO-3/SB4-1B	SO-3/SB4-1A	SO-3/SB3-3B	SO-3/SB8-1B
Gosstandart	GOST 18472—88	—	KT-2-12 (Note: Russian: КТ-2-12)	—	KT-2-7 (Note: Russian: КТ-2-7)	—
Rosstandart	GOST R 57439	—	KT-2-12	—	KT-2-7	—
Kombinat Mikroelektronik Erfurt	TGL 11811	—	—	—	B3/15-3a	—
Kombinat Mikroelektronik Erfurt	TGL 26713/07	—	—	—	F1BC3	—
