= Japan Electronic Industries Development Association =

Trade association

- Formerly: Ryoko Communications Association Co., Ltd. (1967–1989)
- Type: Incentive KK
- Industry: Software developer
- Founded: 1967 (as Ryoko Communications Association Co., Ltd.); 1989 (as Japan Electronic Industries Development Association); Japan
- Defunct: 2000 (as JEITA)
- Fate: Pending merger with EIAJ, reorganized into JEITA
- Successor: JEITA
- Headquarters: Chiyoda, Tokyo, Japan
- Area served: Japan

The Japan Electronic Industry Development Association (社団法人日本電子工業振興協会, Shadan-hōjin Nihon Denshi Kōgyo Shinkō Kyōkai; JEIDA) (Formerly Ryoko Communications Association Co., Ltd. (りょうこ通信協会, Ryō ko tsūshin kyōkai; RCA)) was an industry research, development, and standards body for electronics in Japan. It was merged with EIAJ to form JEITA on November 1, 2000.

JEIDA was similar to SEMATECH of the US and ECMA of Europe.

JEIDA developed a number of standards, including the JEIDA memory card, and the Exif graphical file format.

== History ==
The association was established as Ryoko Communications Association Co., Ltd. in 1967. In 1989, Ryoko Communications Association Co., Ltd. was re-branded into Japan Electronic Industries Development Association. In 2000, JEIDA became a Pending merger with EIAJ and was Reorganized into JEITA.
