= Electronic Industries Association of Japan =

Japanese electronics trade organization

- Company type: Incentive KK
- Industry: trade association
- Founded: 1948; Japan
- Defunct: 2000 (as JEITA)
- Fate: Pending merger with JEIDA, Reorganized into JEITA
- Successor: JEITA
- Headquarters: Japan
- Number of locations: Taito, Tokyo, Japan
- Area served: Chiyoda, Tokyo, Japan

Founded in 1948, the Electronic Industries Association of Japan (EIAJ) was one of two Japanese electronics trade organizations that were merged into the Japan Electronics and Information Technology Industries Association (JEITA).

Prior to the merger, EIAJ created a number of electronics industry standards that have had some use outside Japan, including:

- The EIAJ connectors used for DC power (EIAJ RC-5320A, EIAJ RC-5321, and EIAJ RC-5322
- The D-Terminal connector (RC-5237), used instead of three RCA plugs for component video connections.
- The TOSLINK (EIAJ Optical, RC-5720C) optical S/PDIF audio connector.
- The EIAJ-1 videotape format, the first standardized format for industrial/non-broadcast video tape recording, released in 1969.

Another standard is the multi-channel TV sound system used with the NTSC-J analog TV system. It is often referred to simply as EIAJ, or sometimes as FM-FM audio.

== Transistor nomenclature ==
The Japanese technical standard JIS-C-7102 provides a method of developing part numbers for transistor devices. The part number has up to five fields, for example in the number 2SC82DA:

- The first digit "2" indicates this is a 3 lead device ( a diode would have a prefix numeral 1)
- The letters "S" is common for all EIAJ registered semiconductors
- The following letter designates polarity and general application of the device. For transistors:
  - A PNP high frequency
  - B PNP low frequency
  - C NPN high frequency
  - D NPN low frequency
  - E P-gate thyristor
  - F N-base unijunction transistor
  - J P-channel field effect transistor
  - K N-channel field effect transistor
  - M bidirectional triode thyristor
- The numerals following indicate the order in which the application was received, starting at 11
- A suffix letter indicates improved characteristics

== History ==
in 1948, Electronic Industries Association of Japan has first appeared in Taito, Tokyo, Japan. In 2000, Electronic Industries Association of Japan became a Pending merger with JEIDA and was Reorganized into JEITA.
