= Japan Electronics and Information Technology Industries Association =

Japanese trade organization

- Type: General incorporated association
- Industry: trade association
- Predecessor: Electronic Industries Association of Japan; Japan Electronic Industries Development Association
- Founded: 2000
- Headquarters: Chiyoda, Tokyo, Japan
- Area served: Japan

The Japan Electronics and Information Technology Industries Association (Japanese: 社団法人電子情報技術産業協会, Hepburn: Shadan-hōjin Denshi Jōhō Gijutsu Sangyō Kyōkai; JEITA) is a Japanese trade organization for the electronics and IT industries. It organizes the CEATEC trade fair.

It was formed in 2000 from two earlier organizations, the Electronic Industries Association of Japan and the Japan Electronic Industries Development Association.

== History ==
The association was established as Minato Communications Association Co., Ltd. in 1979. In 2000, Minato Communications Association Co., Ltd. was re-branded into Japan Electronics and Information Technology Industries Association.

== See also ==
- JIS semiconductor designation
- Design rule for Camera File system
- ISDB
- EIAJ DC coaxial power connector standards
