= 2N2907 =

PNP bipolar transistor

The 2N2907 is a commonly available PNP bipolar junction transistor used for general purpose low-power amplifying or switching applications. It is designed for low to medium current, low power, medium voltage, and can operate at moderately high speeds. This transistor was made by several manufacturers; Texas Instruments released a data sheet for their version of this part dated March 1973. An "A" suffix indicates a slightly higher breakdown voltage. These transistors have an enduring popularity with electronics hobbyists.

== Specifications ==
It is a 0.6-ampere, 60-volt, 400-milliwatt transistor. Its transition frequency f_{T} (where the current gain drops to one) under specified test conditions is 200 Megahertz. At low frequencies, the current gain (beta) is at least 100. The 2N2907 is used in a variety of analog amplification and switching applications.

== Part numbers ==
The 2N2907 (PNP) and 2N2222 (NPN) are complementary transistor pairs. Other types of transistors with different properties and connections have different part numbers. The prefix of each part number varies for each physical package type. Pin connections vary with different part numbers.

Transistor part numbers
BJT	Thru-hole		Surface-mount	
BJT	TO-18	TO-92	SOT23	SOT223
PNP	2N2907	PN2907	MMBT2907	PZT2907A
NPN	2N2222	PN2222	MMBT2222	PZT2222A

== See also ==
- 2N3904
- 2N3906
- 2N3055
- BC108
- BC548
- KT315
