= 2N3906 =

Common PNP bipolar junction transistor

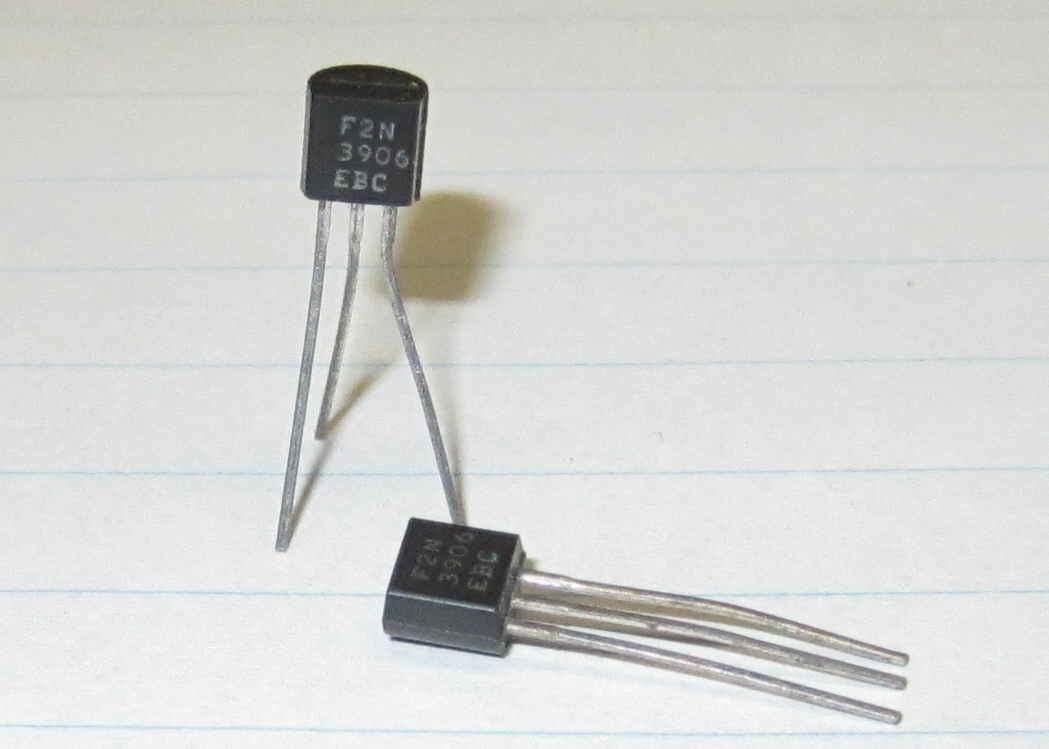
2N3906 transistors in plastic TO-92 packaging. The cases are marked with E, B, and C for lead identification.

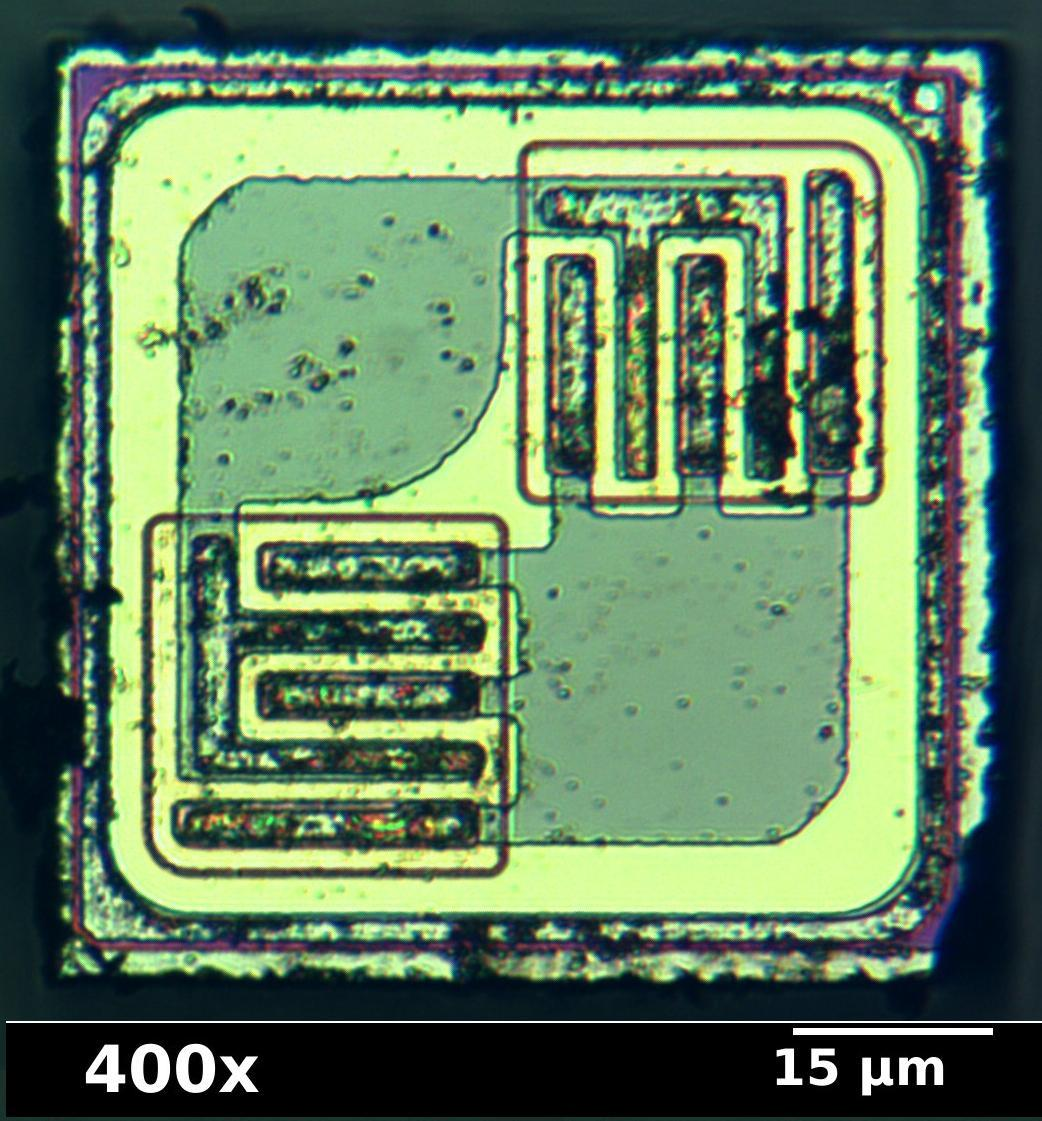
Photomicrograph of the transistor chip inside a 2N3906 transistor package, showing the conductive metal layers used to connect the semiconductor junctions to the package leads. The upper-left and lower-right quadrants are bonding pad areas where wires for two of the terminals are attached, and the other two quadrants have the actual transistor structures, in a bulk region that is contacted at the back side of the chip to the third terminal.

The 2N3906 is a commonly used PNP bipolar junction transistor intended for general purpose low-power amplifying or switching applications. It is designed for low electric current and power and medium voltage, and can operate at moderately high speeds. It is complementary to the 2N3904 NPN transistor. Both types were registered by Motorola Semiconductor in the mid-1960s.

== Device packaging and specifications ==
The 2N3906 is manufactured in a plastic TO-92 case. When looking at the flat side with the leads pointed downward, the three leads emerging from the case are, from left to right, the emitter, base, and collector leads.

The 2N3906 is specified by a collector current of 200 mA, collector-base and collector-emitter voltages of 40 V, for power dissipation of 300 mW. Its transition frequency F_{t} is 250 MHz, with a beta of at least 100.

== Part numbers ==
The 2N3904 (NPN) and 2N3906 (PNP) are complementary transistor pairs. These transistors are available in package styles TO-92, SOT23, SOT223 with different prefixes.

Transistor part numbers
BJT	Thru-hole	Surface-mount	
BJT	TO92	SOT23	SOT223
NPN	2N3904	MMBT3904	PZT3904
PNP	2N3906	MMBT3906	PZT3906

== See also ==
- 2N2222, 2N2907
- 2N3055
- BC108
- BC548
- KT315
