= BC548 =

Type of transistor in electronic equipment

BC548 transistor

The BC548 is a general-purpose NPN bipolar junction transistor commonly used in European and American electronic equipment. Notably, it is often the first type of bipolar transistor hobbyists encounter and is often featured in designs in hobby electronics magazines where a general-purpose transistor is required. The BC548 is low in cost and widely available.

== History and usage ==
The BC548 is a part of a family of NPN and PNP planar epitaxial silicon transistors that originated with the metal-cased BC108 family of transistors. The BC548 is the modern plastic-packaged BC108; the BC548 article at the Radiomuseum website describes the BC548 as a successor to the BC238 and differing from the BC108 in only the shape of the package. Datasheets for the BC548 give specifications that are identical to, or exceed, those of the BC108, BC148 and BC238 predecessors. Thus the BC548 (or BC546 to 550) is a valid substitute in any circuit designed for the older BC108 (or BC148), which includes many Mullard and Philips published designs.

== Pinout and specifications ==
The BC548 is supplied in a standard TO-92 3-pin package. The assignment of transistor elements (b, c, e) to leads, i.e. the "pinout", follows the same convention used by some – but not all – other TO-92 devices. As viewed in the top-right image, going from left to right, the pinout is as follows:

- lead 1 (left in diagram) is the collector,
- lead 2 is the base, and
- lead 3 is the emitter.

Sometimes the middle pin is supplied bent to form a triangle of leads (as found in TO-18 case transistors and, for example, the ZTX108-L) to match the pinout of the BC108 more exactly.

The BC548 part number is assigned by Pro Electron, which allows many manufacturers to offer electrically and physically interchangeable parts under one identification. Devices registered to this Pro Electron number must have the following minimum performance characteristics:

- Breakdown voltage, collector-to-emitter with base open-circuit V_{CEO} = 30 V (see below)
- Rated continuous collector current I_{C} = 100 mA (Fairchild's BC548 at one time had a higher rating)
- Rated total power dissipation P_{total} = 500 mW (some manufacturers may specify 625 mW - see below)
- Transition frequency (gain-bandwidth product) f_{T} = 150 MHz minimum (300 MHz typical)

== Variants ==
The BC548 was released with, and often is found together in datasheets with, the BC547 (higher voltage) and BC549 (lower noise) devices, that correspond to the original BC107 and BC109 variants of the BC108. This group of NPN transistors share many specifications and characteristic curves, but differ in voltage ratings; the BC546 and BC547 are essentially the same as the BC548 but selected with higher breakdown voltages, while the BC549 is a low noise version, and the BC550 is both high-voltage and low-noise. The BC556 to BC560 are the PNP complementary counterparts of the BC546 to BC550, respectively. See the BC108 family for a table of these differences, and comparisons with predecessor types.

Some manufacturers specify their parts with higher ratings, for example the Fairchild 1997 datasheet (547ABC, Rev B) for the BC547, sourced from Process 10 gave 500mA as the maximum collector current, while their datasheets dated 2002 have dropped the current rating to the standard 100mA. The power rating (in free air at 25 °C) is also subject to variation, from 500 mW to 625 mW; the latter now being the most common. There is lot of variation in the transition frequency (f_{T}) from manufacturer to manufacturer.

=== Gain groups ===
The type number of any of the devices in this "family" may be followed by a letter, "A" to "C", indicating devices that have been selected that fall within a narrow range of gain (h_{FE}). The same letters are used for this purpose in several other European transistors, and is similar in principle to the "Yellow", "Blue" (and so on) gain groupings in Japanese transistors, but should not be confused with the "A" suffix used with some American (JEDEC) devices, such as the 2N2222A, to indicate a variety of differences or enhancements over the base type.

The BC548 is available in three different gain groups:.

- "A" indicates low gain (110 to 220, typically 180) at 2 mA collector current,
- "B" indicates medium gain (200 to 450)
- "C" indicates high gain (420 to 800)

So a BC548 might have a current gain anywhere between 110 and 800, but the gain of a BC548A would be within the range of 110 to 220.

Notes: Some manufacturers place slightly different limits on the gain groups, for example the "B" group has been quoted as 220–475 in a Philips 1997 datasheet. The BC547 variant rarely is available in the "C" gain group, and the BC549 rarely in the "A" gain group.

=== Complementary pairs ===
The PNP counterparts of the BC546 to BC550 are the BC556 to BC560 respectively, i.e. the type numbers are higher by ten.

==== BC558 ====
The BC558 is the PNP version of the BC548, and has higher voltage versions: BC556 and BC557, and lower noise versions: BC559 and BC560.

=== SMD versions of the BC546 to BC560 ===
The surface-mount package versions are the BC846 to BC850 (and PNP versions: BC856 to BC860).

== See also ==
- 2N2222, 2N2907
- 2N3904, 2N3906
- 2N3055
- BC108
- KT315
