= 2N2222 =

Common NPN bipolar junction transistor

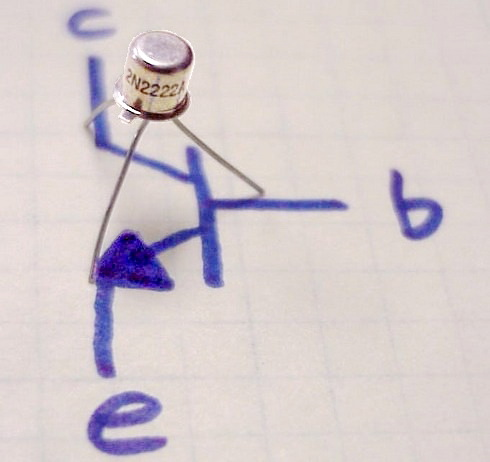
2N2222A in metal TO-18 package with the emitter, base and collector identified as E, B, and C respectively.

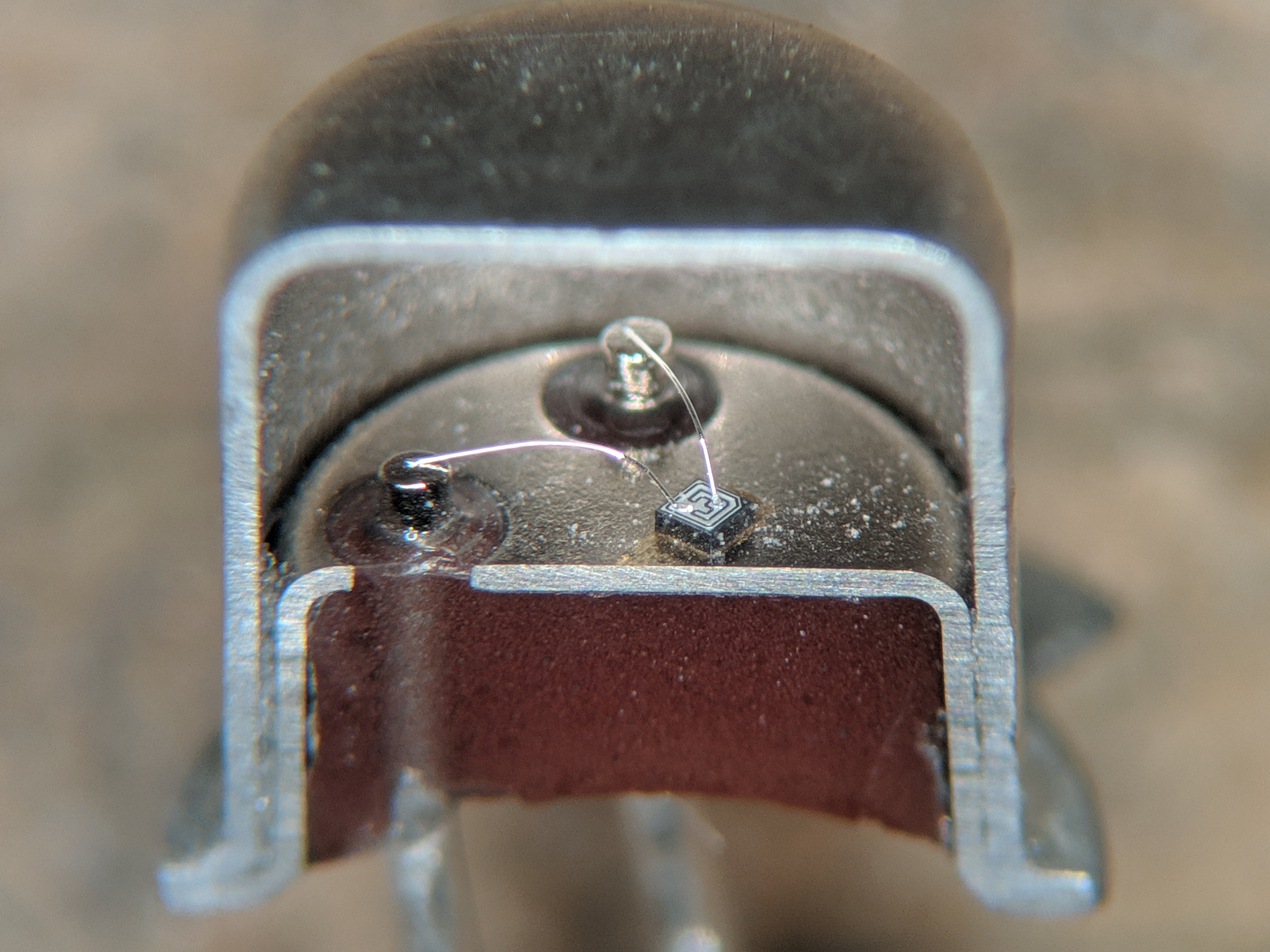
Cross section of 2N2222 in metal TO-18 package, showing connection wires between external pins and die.

The 2N2222 is a common NPN bipolar junction transistor (BJT) used for general purpose low-power amplifying or switching applications. It is designed for low to medium current, low power, medium voltage, and can operate at moderately high speeds. It was originally made in the TO-18 metal can as shown in the picture.

The 2N2222 is considered a very common transistor, and is used as an exemplar of an NPN transistor. It is frequently used as a small-signal transistor, and it remains a small general purpose transistor of enduring popularity.

The 2N2222 was part of a family of devices invented by John C Haenichen of Motorola at a 1962 IRE convention. Since then it has been made by many semiconductor companies, for example, Texas Instruments.

== Specifications ==
The JEDEC registration of a device number ensures particular rated values will be met by all parts offered under that number. JEDEC registered parameters include outline dimensions, small-signal current gain, transition frequency, maximum values for voltage withstand, current rating, power dissipation and temperature rating, and others, measured under standard test conditions. Other part numbers will have different parameters. The exact specifications depend on the manufacturer, case type, and variation. Therefore, it is important to refer to the datasheet for the exact part number and manufacturer.

Manufacturer	V_{ce}	I_{c}	P_{tot}	f_{T}
ST Microelectronics 2N2222A	40 V	600 mA	500 mW (T_{amb} ≤ 25 °C); 1.8 W (T_{c} ≤ 25 °C)	300 MHz

All variations have a beta or current gain (h_{fe}) of at least 100 in optimal conditions. It is used in a variety of analog amplification and switching applications.

== Other switching transistors ==
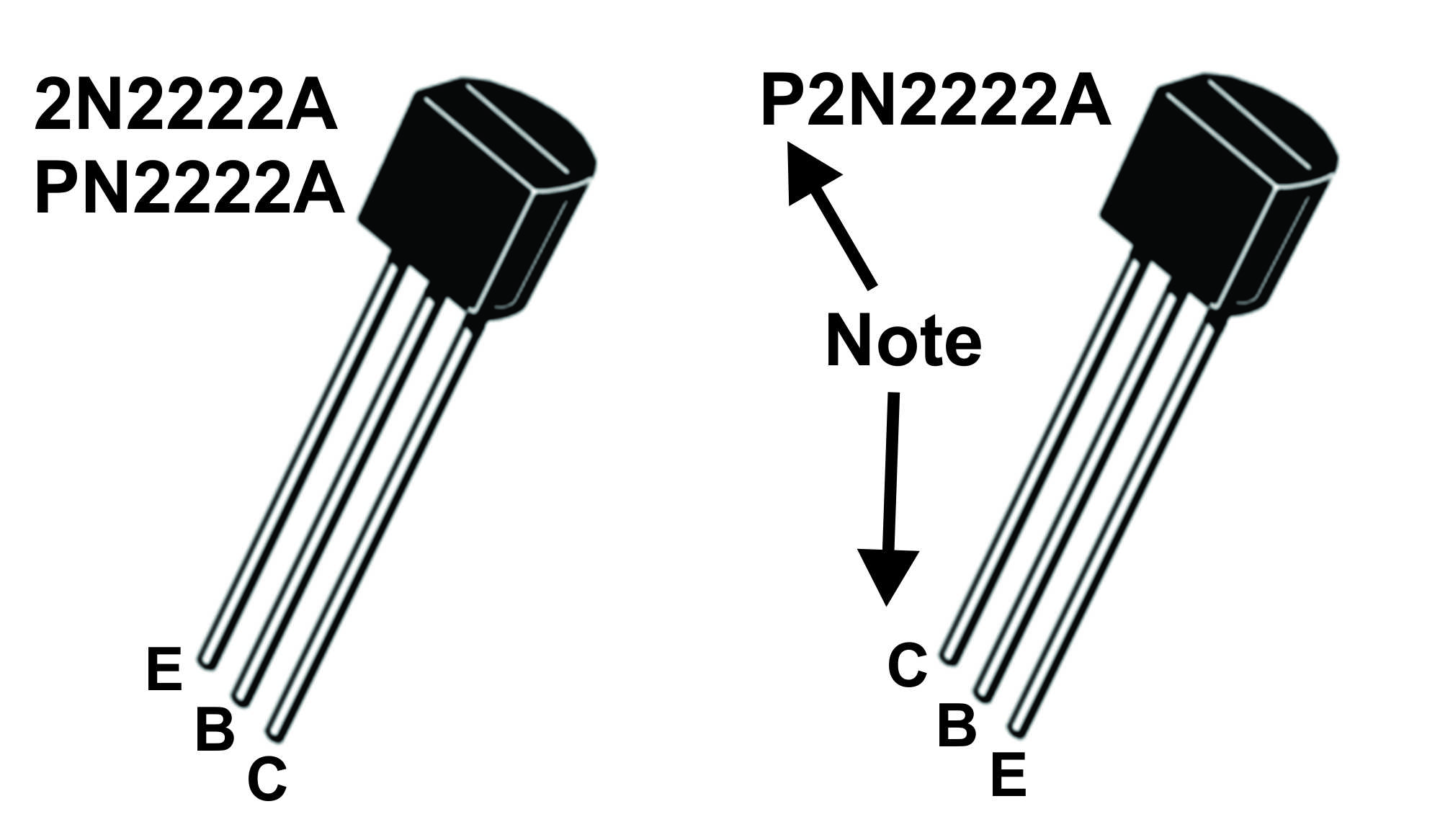
Pinout of 2N2222 variants in plastic TO-92 package.

NPN silicon transistors with similar properties are also made in a variety of small through-hole and surface mount packages including TO-92, SOT-23, and SOT-223.

Replacements for the 2N2222 are commonly available in the cheaper TO-92 packaging, where it is known as the PN2222 or P2N2222, which has similar specifications except for the lower maximum collector current. The P2N2222 has a different order of pins than the metal case 2N2222, with its emitter and collector connections switched; other plastic-case transistors also have different pinouts.

Single transistors are also available in several different surface mount packages, and a number of manufacturers market surface mount packages that incorporate several 2N2222-type transistors in one package as an array of transistors. The general specifications of the various variants are similar, with the biggest difference being the maximum allowable current and power dissipation.

The BC548 family, including the BC547A to BC550C, are lower voltage, lower current, general-purpose transistors in TO-92 packages, originating in Europe, that are often found in small-signal amplification and switching circuits of the type where the 2N2222 might otherwise be used. They are not true replacements, but comparable devices that may be substituted only in circuits where the maximum current and voltage ratings are not exceeded.

The 2N2907 is an equally popular PNP transistor complementary to the 2N2222.

The 2N3904 is an NPN transistor that can only switch one-third the current of the 2N2222 but has otherwise similar characteristics. The 2N3904 exhibits its forward gain (beta) peak at a lower current than the 2N2222, and is useful in amplifier applications with reduced I_{c}, e.g., (gain peak at 10 mA for the 2N3904 but 150 mA for the 2N2222).

A version of the 2N2222A in a larger metal TO-39 case, the 2N2219A had a higher power dissipation rating (3 watts when attached to a heatsink that keeps the case temperature at 25 C, or 0.8 watts in free air, compared with only 1.8 watts and 0.5 watts (respectively) for the 2N2222A.

== Part numbers ==
The 2N2222 (NPN) and 2N2907 (PNP) are complementary transistor pairs. The prefix of each part number varies for each physical package type.

Transistor part numbers
BJT	Thru-hole		Surface-mount	
BJT	TO-18	TO-92	SOT23	SOT223
NPN	2N2222	PN2222	MMBT2222	PZT2222A
PNP	2N2907	PN2907	MMBT2907	PZT2907A

== See also ==
- 2N3906
- 2N3055
- BC108
- BC548
- KT315
