= 2N3904 =

Common NPN bipolar junction transistor

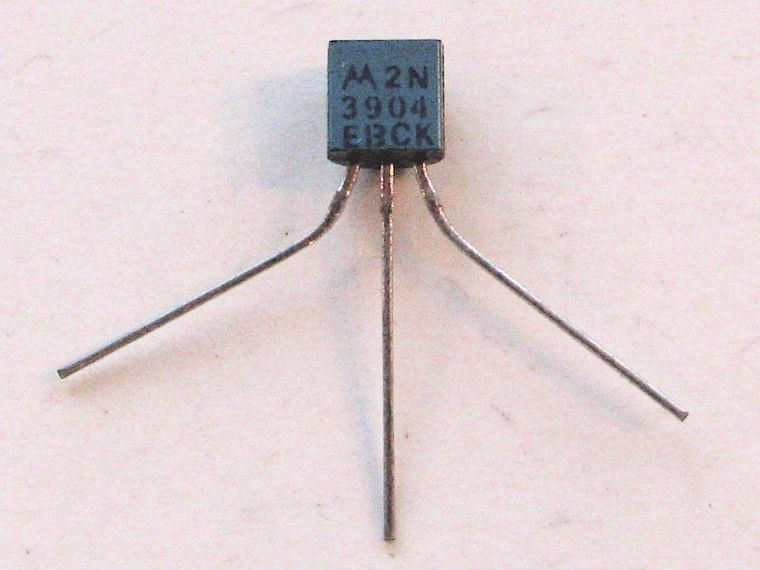
A 2N3904 made by Motorola. The pinout from left to right is: Emitter, Base, Collector.

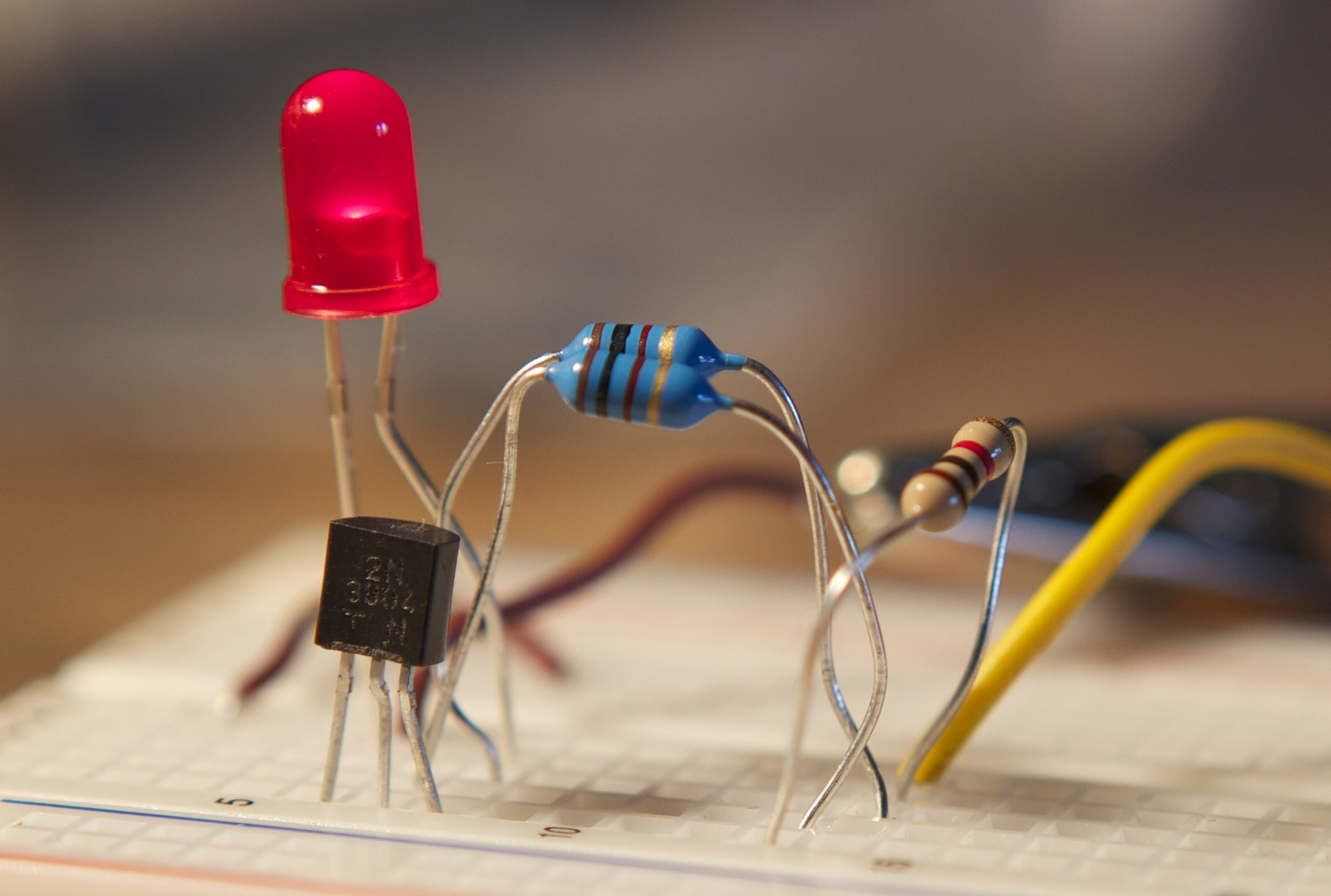
A 2N3904 (lower left) in a TO-92 package on a breadboard

The 2N3904 is a common NPN bipolar junction transistor used for general-purpose low-power amplifying or switching applications. It is designed for low current and power, medium voltage, and can operate at moderately high speeds. It is complementary to the 2N3906 PNP transistor. Both types were registered by Motorola Semiconductor in the mid-1960s.

== Device packaging and specifications ==
The construction of the 2N3904 and 2N3906 in the 1960s represented a significant performance and cost improvement, with the plastic TO-92 case replacing metal cans. This transistor is a low-cost device, widely available and sufficiently robust to be of use to experimenters and electronics hobbyists. When looking at the flat side with the leads pointed downward, the three wires emerging from the bottom are connected to, from left to right, the emitter, the base and the collector. Some manufacturers mark "EBC" on the molded part, but all are required to have those connections for a part which is a "2N3904".

It is a 200 mA, 40 V, 625 mW transistor with a transition frequency of 300 MHz, with a minimum beta, or current gain, of 100 at a collector current of 10 mA.

== Related parts ==
Electrically similar devices, such as the MMBT3904, are available in a variety of small through-hole and surface-mount packages, including TO-92, SOT-23, and SOT-223, with package-dependent thermal ratings from 625 milliwatts to 1 watt.

The complementary PNP transistor is 2N3906.

== Part numbers ==
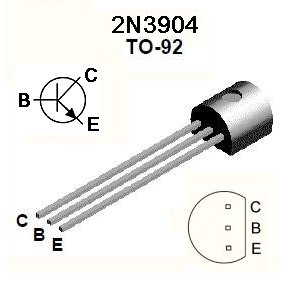
Pinout of 2N3904 in TO-92 package. Top view or PCB layout view is shown in the lower right corner.

The 2N3904 (NPN) and 2N3906 (PNP) are complementary transistor pairs. These transistors are available in package styles TO-92, SOT23, SOT223 with different prefixes.

Transistor part numbers
BJT	Thru-hole	Surface-mount	
BJT	TO92	SOT23	SOT223
NPN	2N3904	MMBT3904	PZT3904
PNP	2N3906	MMBT3906	PZT3906

== See also ==
- 2N2222, 2N2907
- 2N3055
- BC108
- BC548
- KT315
