= Transition frequency =

Transition frequency may refer to:

- A measure of the high-frequency operating characteristics of a transistor, usually symbolized as f_{T}
- A characteristic of spectral lines
- The frequency of the radiation associated with a transition between hyperfine structure energy states of an atom
- Turnover frequency in enzymology
