= BC108 family =

Silicon NPN transistors

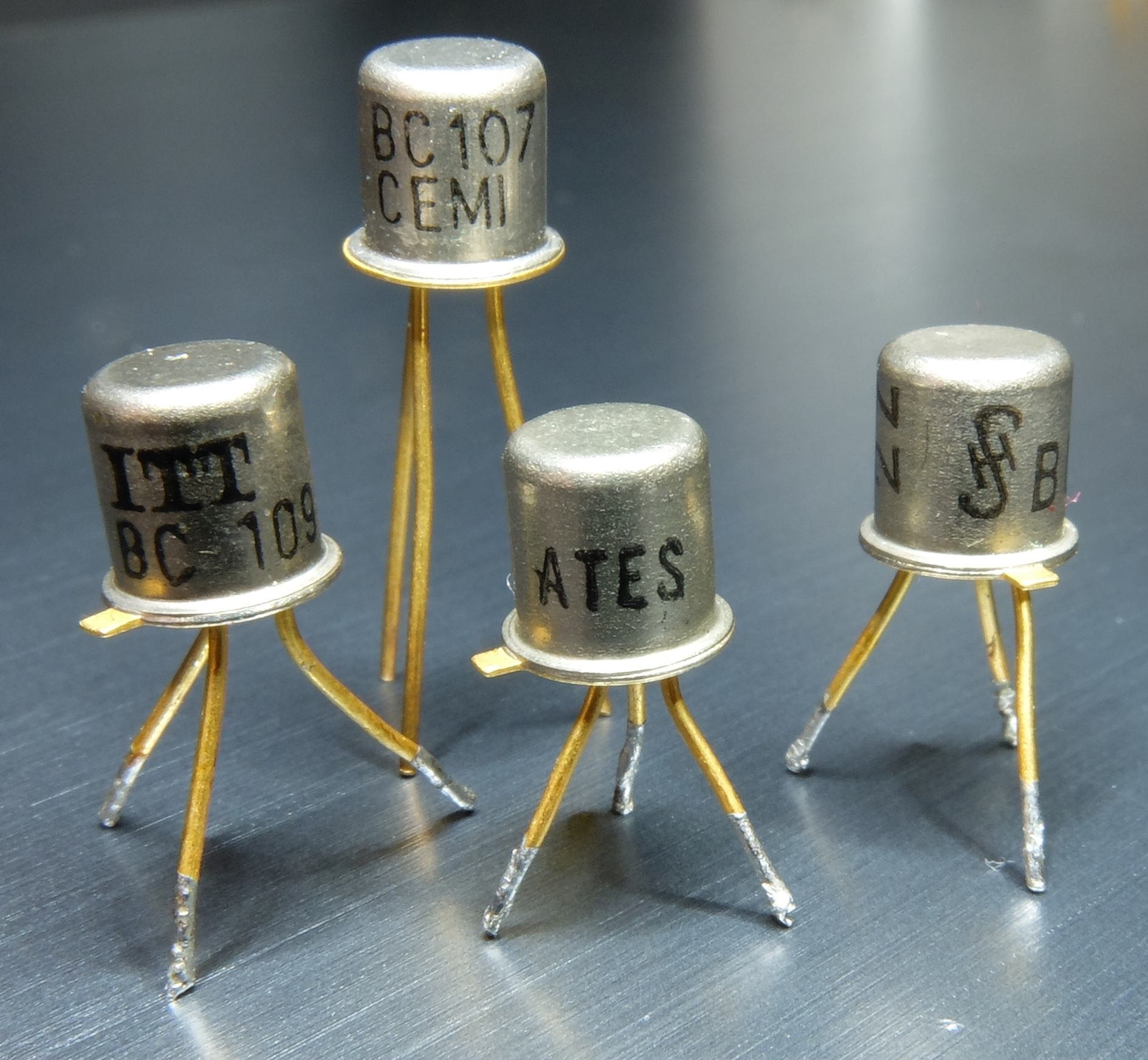
BC108 family transistors from various manufacturers (ITT, CEMI, SGS-ATES, Siemens)

The BC107, BC108 and BC109 are general-purpose low power silicon NPN bipolar junction transistors found very often in equipment and electronics books/articles from Europe, Australia and many other countries from the 1960s. They were created by Philips and Mullard in 1963 and introduced in April 1966. Initially in metal (TO-18) packages, the range expanded over time to include other package types, higher voltage ratings, and a better selection of gain (h_{FE} and h_{fe}) groupings, as well as complementary PNP types. Some manufacturers have specified their parts with a higher power dissipation rating (P_{tot}) than others.

The BC548 is an example of the modern low-cost member of this family, still in a through-hole package, while the BC848 is the surface-mount version.

== Table of BC107 to BC860 variants ==
Case	P_{tot}	Polarity	≥ 70 V_{CBO} ≥ 64 V_{CEO}	50 V_{CBO}	30 V_{CBO}	Low-Noise (<4 dB) 30 V_{CBO}	Low-Noise (<4 dB) 50 V_{CBO}	Notes/Source
TO-18 (C-B-E) Emitter is closest to tab	300 mW	NPN	BC190; 64 V_{CEO}	BC107; BC107A; BC107B 45 V_{CEO}	BC108; BC108A; BC108B; BC108C; 20 V_{CEO}	BC109 BC109B; BC109C; 20 V_{CEO}		Philips Semiconductor Handbook Oct 1966
TO-18 (C-B-E) Emitter is closest to tab	300 mW	PNP		BC177; 45 V_{CEO}	BC178; 25 V_{CEO}	BC179; 25 V_{CEO}		Philips Application Book: Audio Amplifier Systems, 1971
Lockfit (C-B-E)	250 mW	NPN		BC147; 45 V_{CEO}	BC148; 20 V_{CEO}	BC149; 20 V_{CEO}		a discontinued plastic case with leads that locks into a PCB's holes.
Lockfit (C-B-E)	250 mW	PNP		BC157; 45 V_{CEO}	BC158; 25 V_{CEO}	BC159; 20 V_{CEO}		a discontinued plastic case with leads that locks into a PCB's holes.
TO92B (E-C-B)	300 mW	NPN		BC167; 45 V_{CEO}	BC168; 20 V_{CEO}	BC169; 20 V_{CEO}		
TO92B (E-C-B)	300 mW	PNP		BC257; 45 V_{CEO}	BC258; 25 V_{CEO}	BC259; 20 V_{CEO}		(Also: BC256 64 V_{CBO})
TO92F (C-B-E)	300 mW*	NPN	BC174; 64 V_{CEO}	BC171; BC237; 45 V_{CEO}	BC172; BC238; 20 V_{CEO}	BC173; BC239; 20 V_{CEO}		*Fairchild's power rating is 500 mW; Some devices have pre-formed leads with the base bent backwards like a TO-18 pinout (e.g. MEL).
TO92F (C-B-E)	300 mW*	PNP		BC307; 45 V_{CEO}	BC308; 25 V_{CEO}	BC309; 20 V_{CEO}		*Fairchild's power rating is 500 mW; Some devices have pre-formed leads with the base bent backwards like a TO-18 pinout (e.g. MEL).
TO92A (E-B-C)	310 mW	NPN		BC317; 45 V_{CEO}	BC318; 30 V_{CEO}	BC319; 20 V_{CEO}		Note: 150 mA rating; BC318 V_{CBO} 40 V to 45 V
TO92A (E-B-C)	310 mW	PNP		BC320; 45 V_{CEO}	BC321; 30 V_{CEO}	BC322; 20 V_{CEO}		Note: 150 mA rating; BC318 V_{CBO} 40 V to 45 V
TO92F (C-B-E)	500 mW*	NPN	BC546; 65 V_{CEO}	BC547; 45 V_{CEO}	BC548; 30 V_{CEO}	BC549; 30 V_{CEO}	BC550; 45 V_{CEO}	from Mullard 1977 and Fairchild 2001 specifications; *Some manufacturers specify a 625 mW rating
TO92F (C-B-E)	500 mW*	PNP	BC556; 65 V_{CEO}	BC557; 45 V_{CEO}	BC558; 30 V_{CEO}	BC559; 30 V_{CEO}	BC560; 45 V_{CEO}	from Mullard 1977 and Fairchild 2001 specifications; *Some manufacturers specify a 625 mW rating
SOT-23	150 mW	NPN	BC846; 65 V_{CEO}	BC847; 45 V_{CEO}	BC848; 30 V_{CEO}	BC849; 30 V_{CEO}	BC850; 45 V_{CEO}	Surface-mount
SOT-23	150 mW	PNP	BC856; 65 V_{CEO}	BC857; 45 V_{CEO}	BC858; 30 V_{CEO}	BC859; 30 V_{CEO}	BC860; 45 V_{CEO}	Surface-mount

(See also: for a neat summary of some of the family).

Noise figure (at 1 kHz, for a 2 kilohm source, BW = 200 Hz, I_{C}=0.2 mA/V_{CE}=5 V) is <10 dB for those not tabulated as "Low Noise".

== Current ratings ==
All types have a maximum collector current of 100 mA, except that the original Philips tentative data dated 4.4.1966 specified a maximum collector current of 100 mA peak (I_{CM}) for the BC107/8/9, and Telefunken originally specified a maximum collector current of 50 mA for the BC109, but since at least 1973 all have revised collector currents of 100 mA average or 200 mA peak, except that the BC317-BC322 range have a 150 mA (continuous) rating.

== A, B and C gain groupings ==
The above devices' type numbers may be followed by a letter "A" to "C" to indicate low to high gain (h_{FE}) groups (see BC548 Gain groupings).

== Other characteristics ==
Transistors in this family:

- require a base-emitter voltage (V_{BE(on)}) in the range of 0.55 to 0.7 volts for a collector current of 2 mA when the Collector voltage is 5 volts.
- Will have a saturation voltage (V_{CE(sat)}) of at most 0.2 volts (typically 0.07 volts) at a collector current of 10 mA and a base current of 0.5 mA (when the base voltage is typically 0.73 volts; 0.83 volts maximum).
- Has greater than unity current gain up to a frequency (f_{T}) of at least 150 MHz, typically 250 MHz, at a collector current of 10 mA (typically 85 MHz and a collector current of 0.5 mA)
- These transistors can be found in the list of suitable TUN transistors ("Transistor Universal Npn") by the [Elektor] magazine for their circuits that require general purpose Silicon transistors meeting certain minimum standards.
- These transistors have PNP complementary types, with only the second digit changed (to a number normally greater than 4) to indicate the reversed polarity, e.g. a BC178 is PNP version of the BC108, and a BC559 is a PNP version of a BC549.
- Note that this "family" of transistors do not include every transistor with a type number beginning "BC" and ending in "7", "8" or "9". For example, the BC328 and BC338 transistors are not included in the Elektor list (and not "family" members), despite sharing some similarities.

== See also ==
- 2N2222, 2N2907
- 2N3904, 2N3906
- 2N3055
- BC548
- KT315
