= Small-outline transistor =

Family of discrete surface mount transistors

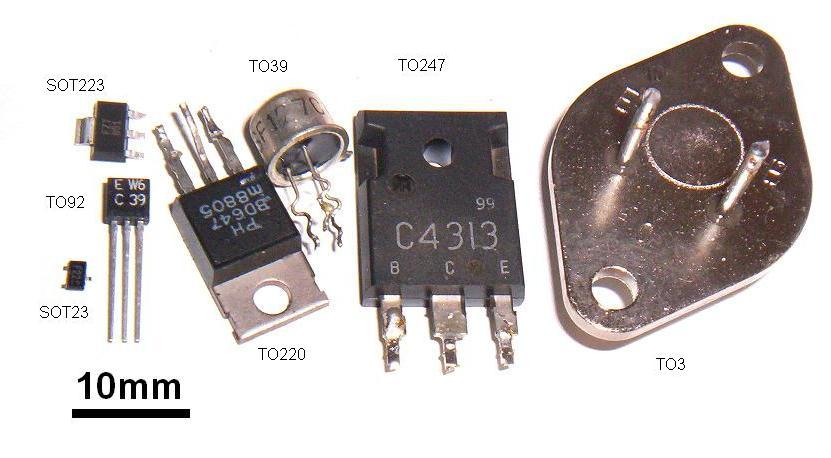
Size comparison of transistor packages. Two surface-mount packages, SOT23 and SOT223, are shown next to through-hole packages

Small outline transistor (SOT) is a family of small footprint, discrete, mostly surface-mount transistor packages commonly used in consumer electronics. Common examples include SOT-23, SOT-89, and SOT-223. The thin small outline transistor (TSOT) series is used where vertical clearance is important.

== SOT23-3, SOT323, SOT416 ==
The SOT23-3 package is very popular and a common package for transistors, as well as diodes and voltage regulators.

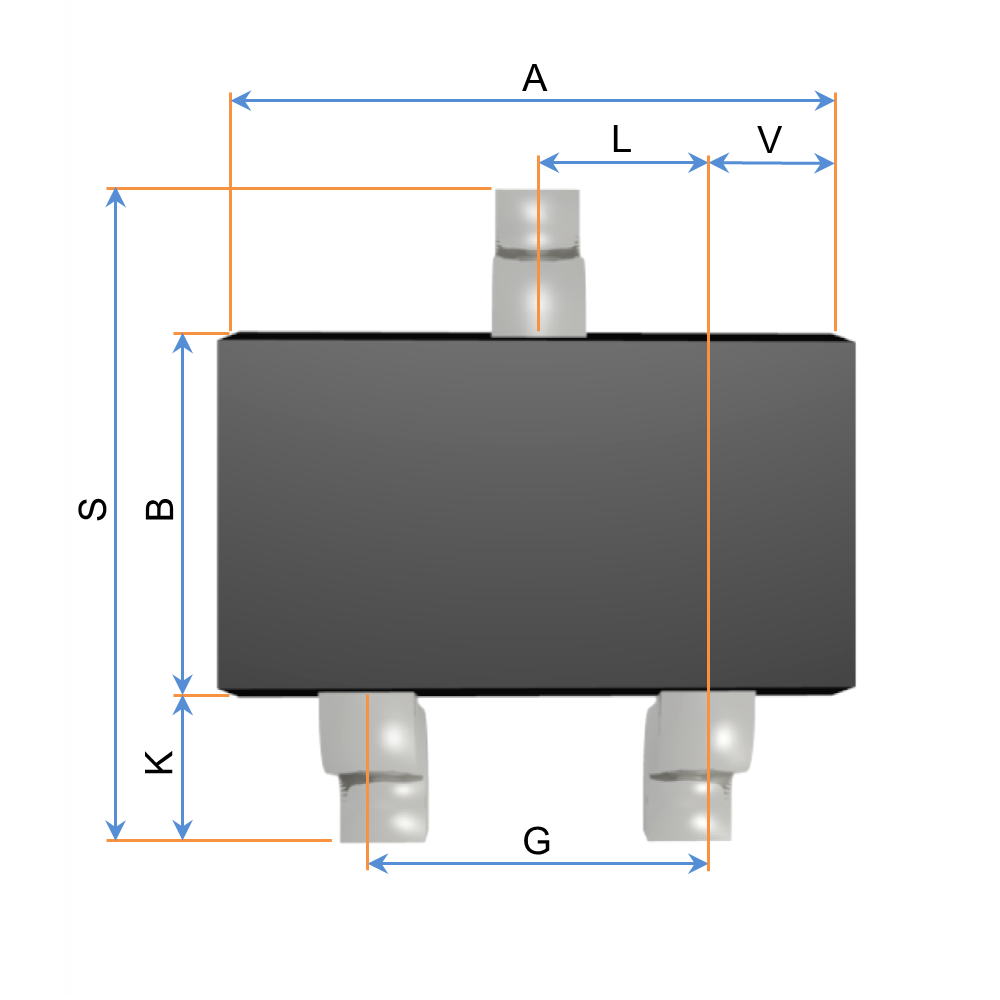
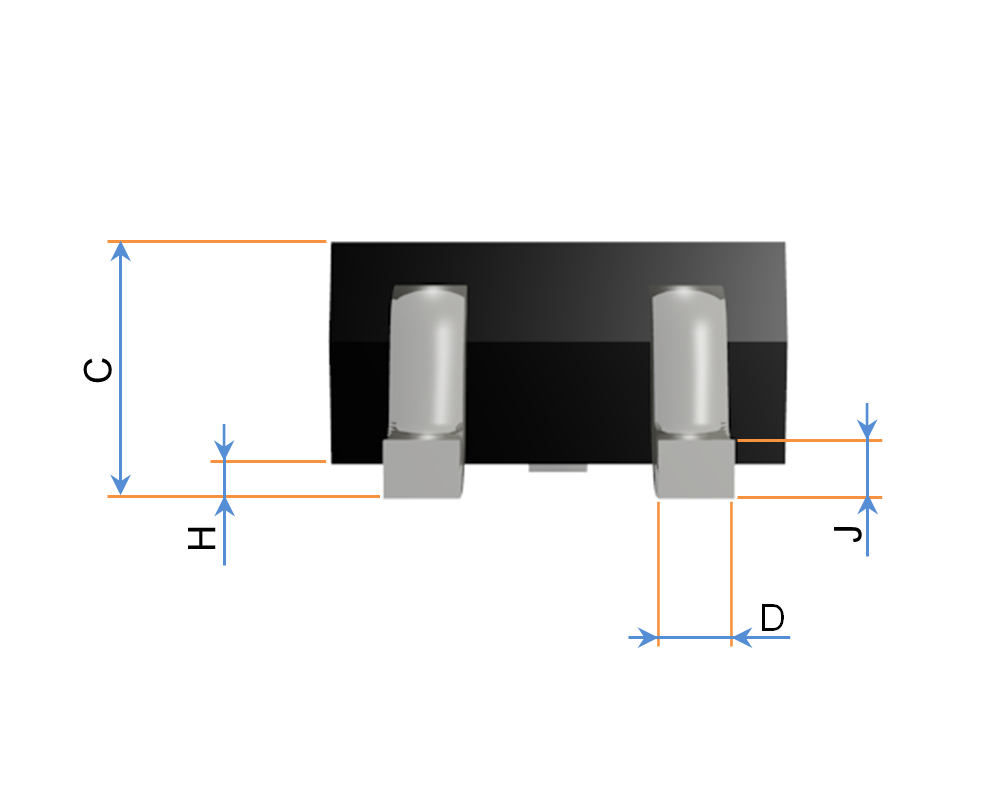
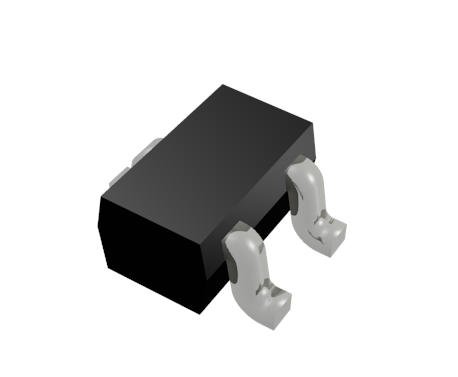

SOT23-3 (TO236AB, SOT346, SC59A, TO236AA, SMT3), SOT323 (SC70-3, UMT3), SOT416 (SOT523, SC75A, SC90, EMT3)
	Dimensions (mm)			
	SOT23	SOT23-3	SOT323	SOT416
A	2.9	2.9	2.0	1.4 - 1.8
B	1.3/1.6	1.3/1.6	1.25	0.7 - 0.9
C				
D				
G	1.9	1.9	1.3	1.0
H				
J				
K				
L	0.95	0.95	0.65	0.5
S				1.45 - 1.75
V				

== SOT23-5, SOT353, SOT553 ==
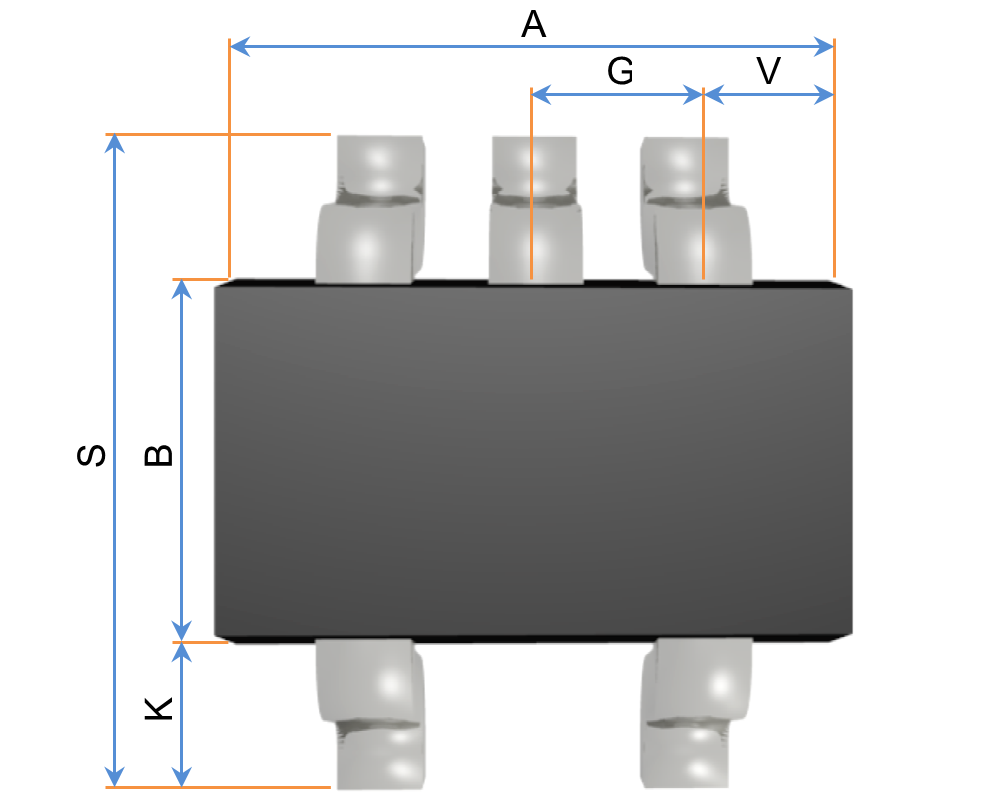
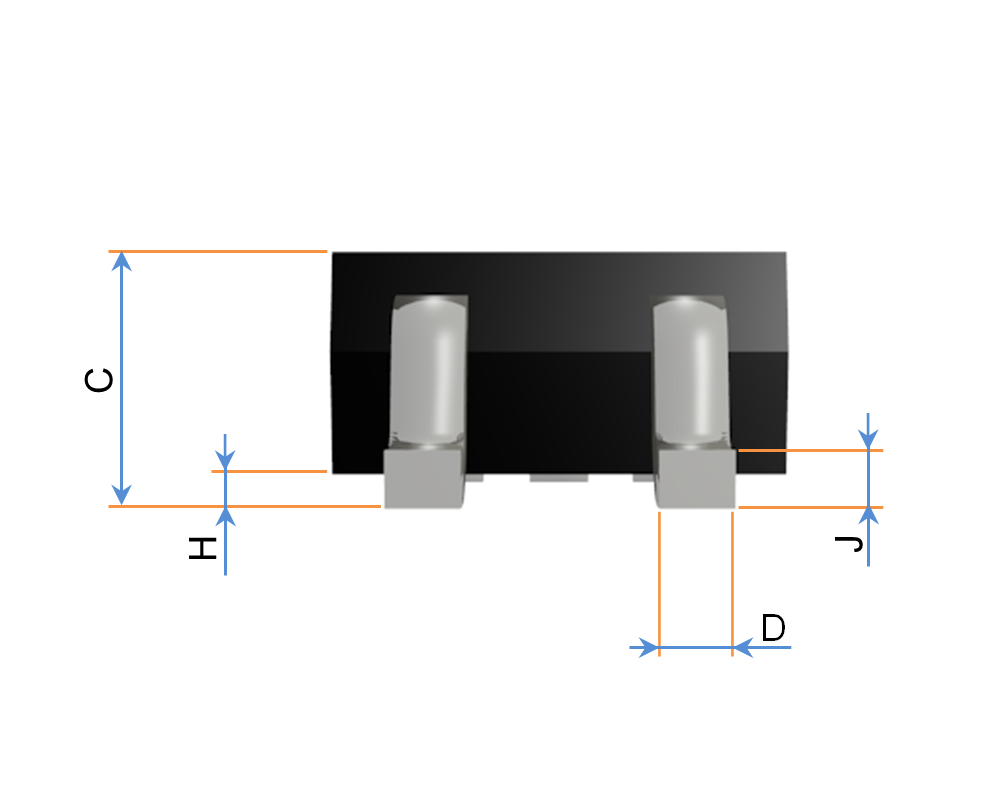
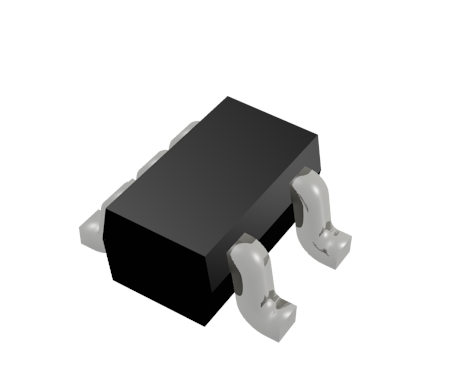

SOT23-5 (SOT25, SC74A, TSOP-5, SOT753, MO-178AA, SMT5), SOT353 (SC70-5, SC88A, TSSOP-5, UMT5), SOT553
	Dimensions (mm)		
	SOT23-5	SOT353	SOT553
A	2.90 ±0.10	2.0 ±0.2	1.60 ±0.10
B	1.60 ±0.10	1.25 ±0.10	1.20 +0.05 -0.10
C	1.04 – 1.44	0.8 – 1.1	0.60 +0.02 -0.05
D	0.350 –0.500	0.2 – 0.3	0.20 +0.10 -0.05
G	0.95	0.65	0.50
H	0.05 –0.15	≤0.1	0.00
J			0.15 +0.03 -0.05
K			0.20 ±0.10
S		2.0 – 2.2	1.60 +0.10 -0.05
V			

== SOT23-6, SOT363, SOT563 ==
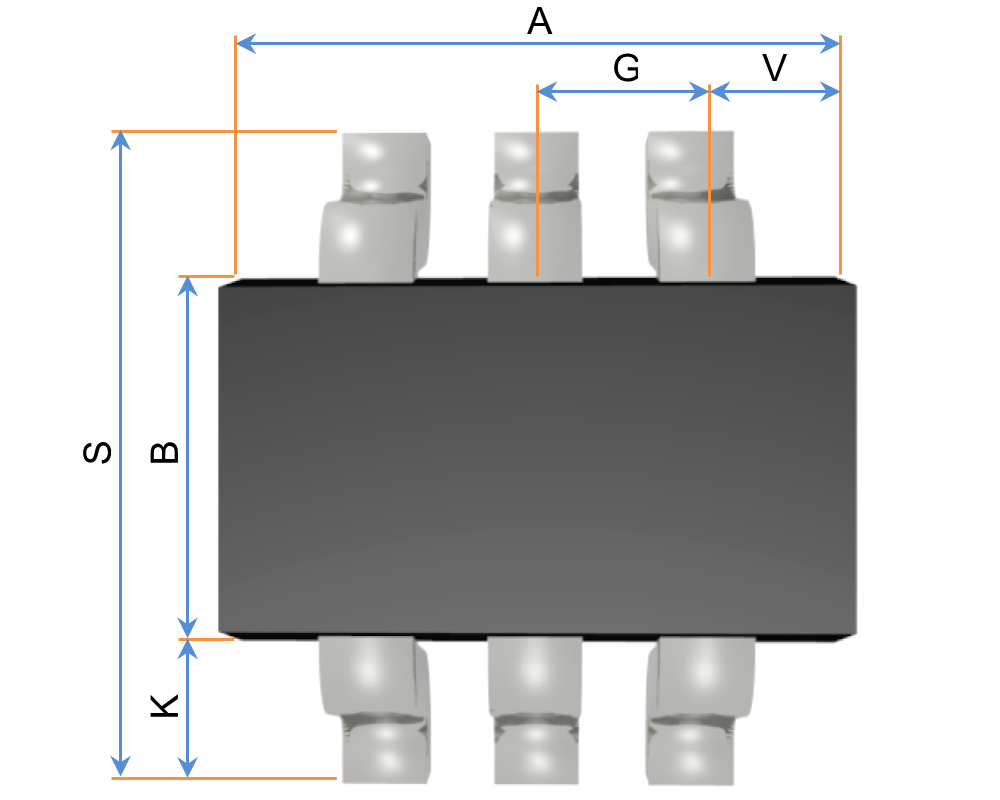
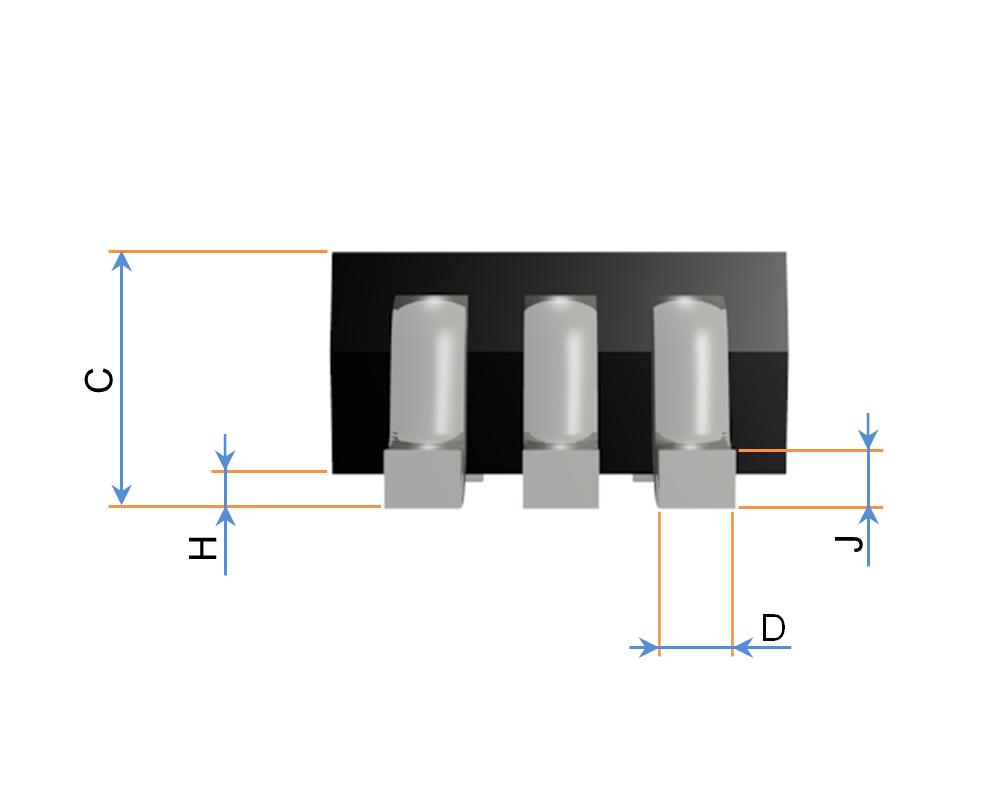
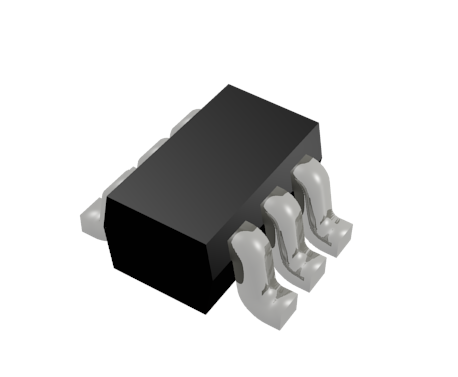

SOT23-6 (SOT26, SC59-6, SC74, TSOP-6, MO-178AB, SMT6, SM6, Mini6, SOT457), SOT363 (SC70-6, SC88, TSSOP-6, UMT6, US6, S-Mini6), SOT563 (SC-107C, ES6)
	Dimensions (mm)		
	SOT23-6	SOT363	SOT563
A	2.9	2.0	1.60 ±0.10
B	1.625	1.25	1.20 +0.05 -0.10
C	1.25	0.95	0.60 +0.02 -0.05
D	0.4	0.25	0.20 +0.10 -0.05
G	0.95	0.65	0.50
H		0.1	0.00
J		0.18	0.15 +0.03 -0.05
K		0.38	0.20 ±0.10
S	2.8	2.1	1.60 +0.10 -0.05
V			

== SOT23-8 ==
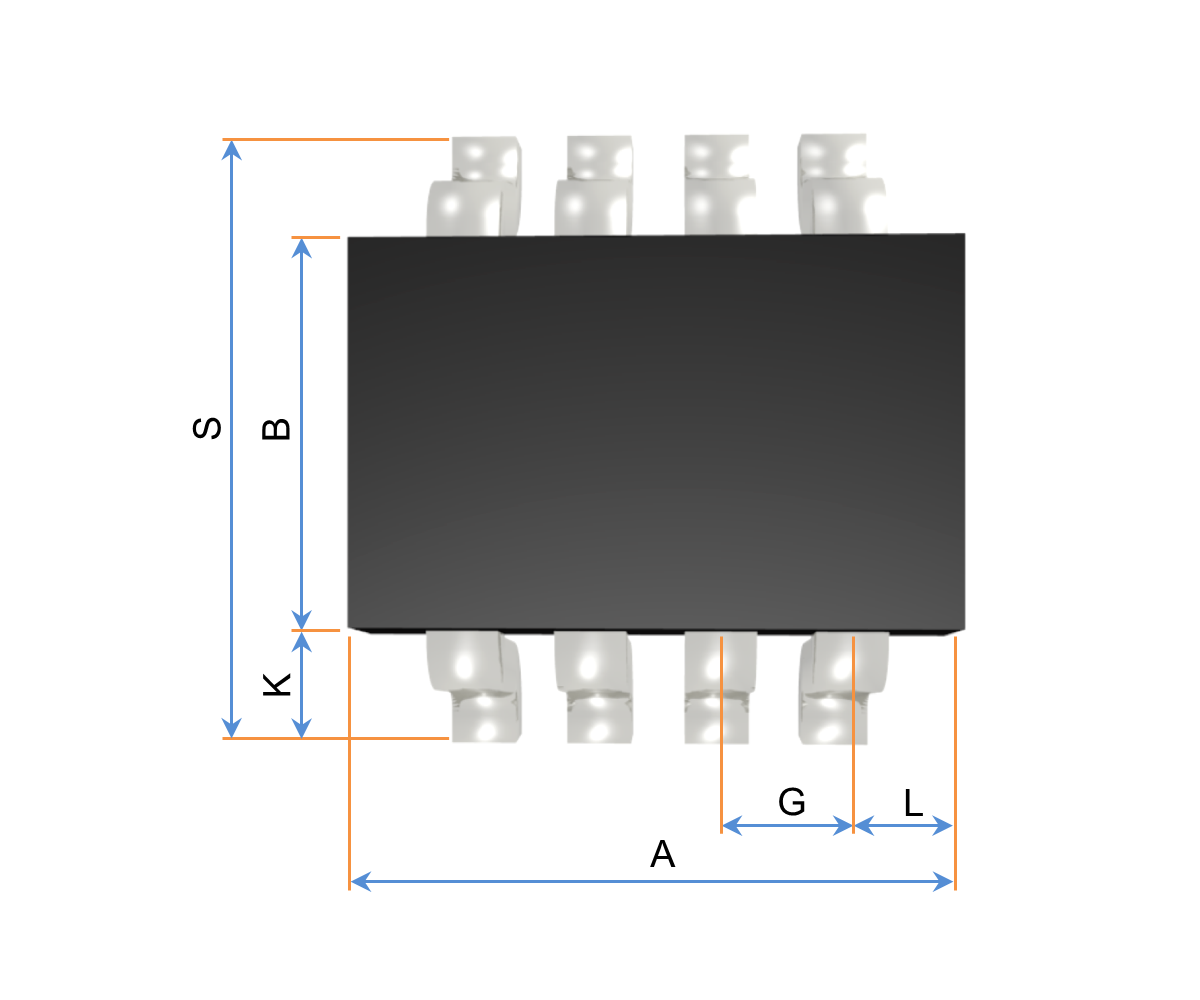
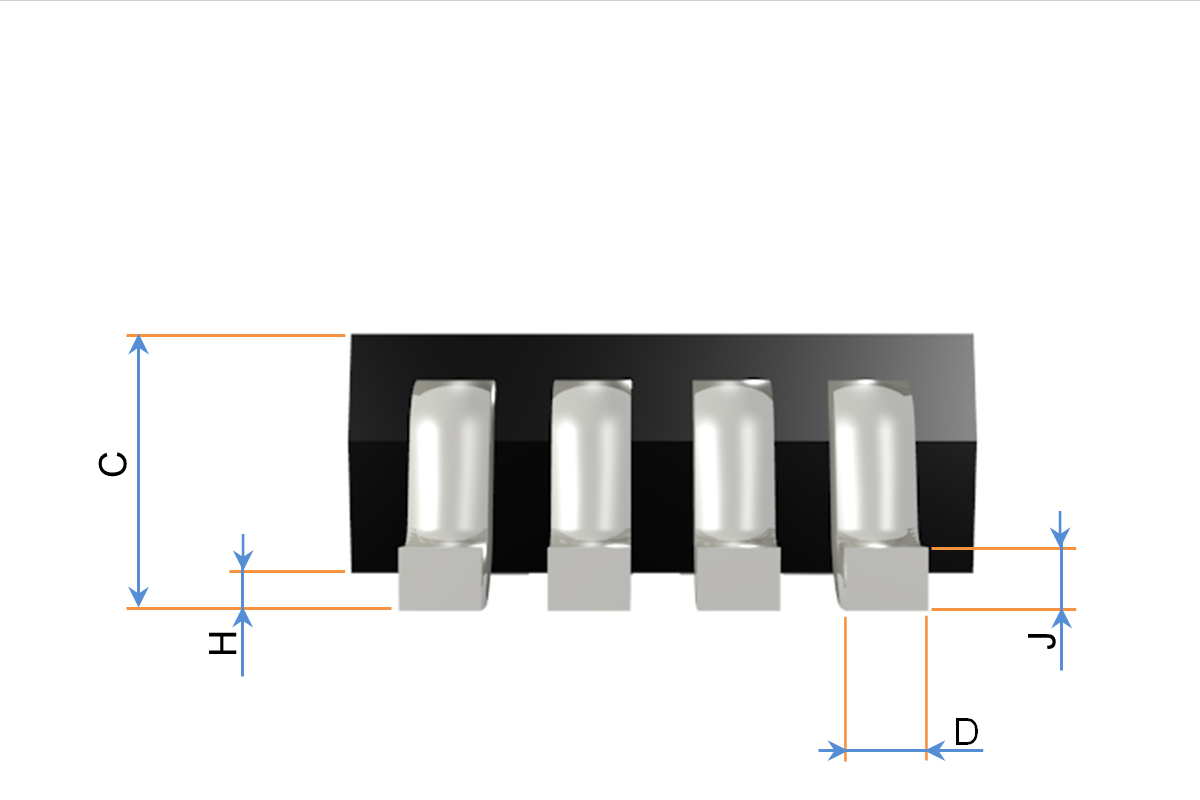
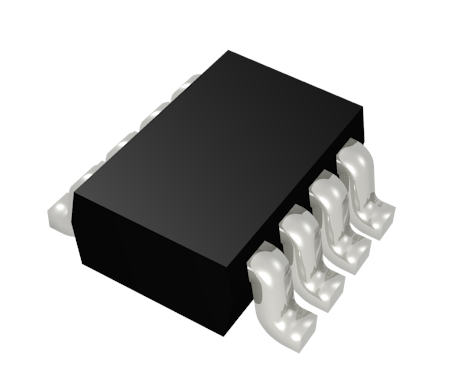

SOT23-8 (SOT28)
	Dimensions (mm)
A	2.90 ± 0.10
B	1.60 ± 0.10
C	1.27
D	0.3
G	0.650 typ.
H	0.0762
J	0.152
K	0.575
S	2.80 ± 0.20
L	

== SOT54 ==
SOT54 is an alternate designation for the JEDEC TO-92 package.

== SOT23-4, SOT143, SOT343 ==
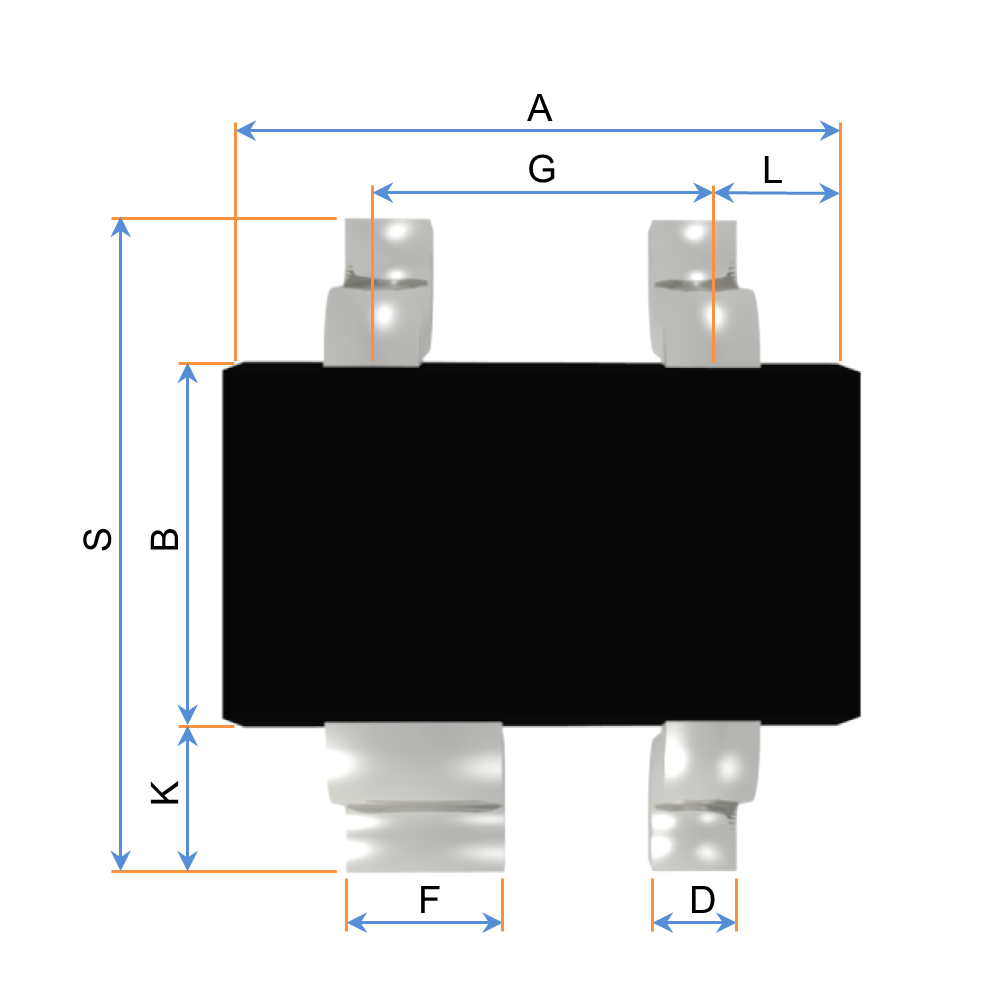
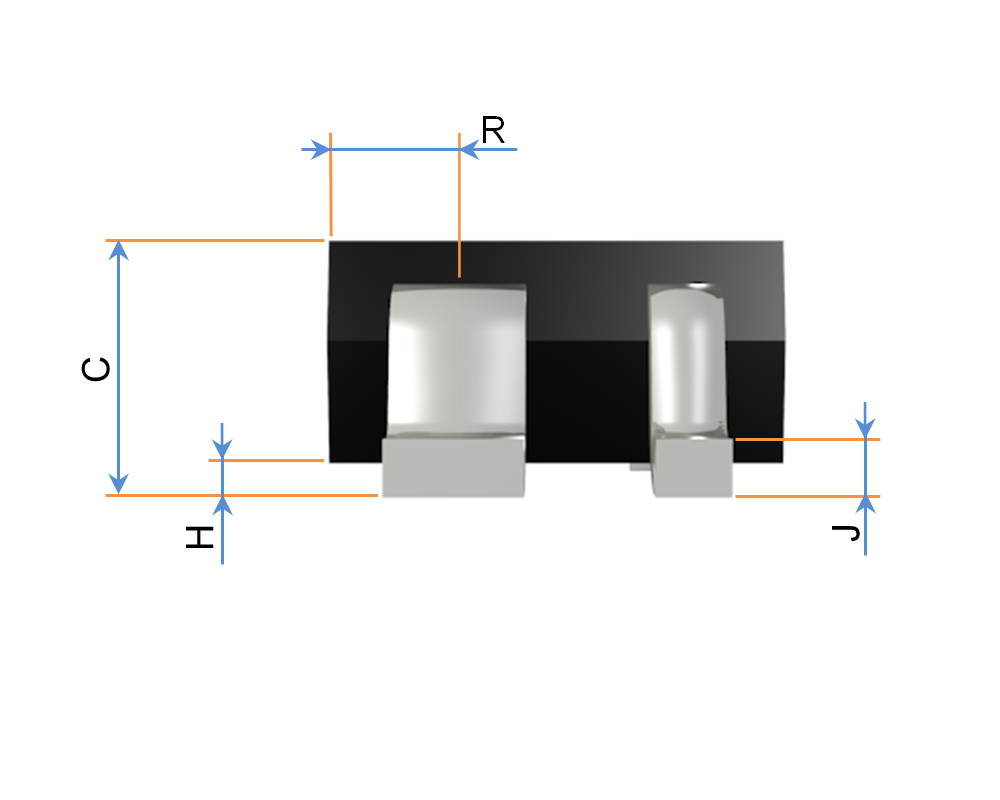
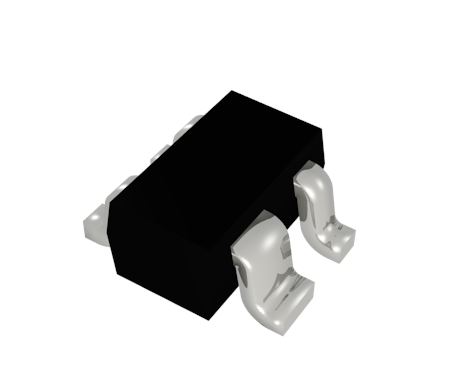

SOT23-4, SOT143 (TO253), SOT343
	Dimensions (mm)	
	SOT143	SOT343
A	2.90 ±0.10	2.00 - 2.20
B	1.30 ±0.10	1.150 - 1.350
C		0.900 - 1.100
D	0.400 +0.110 -0.030	0.250 - 0.400
F	0.800 +0.130 -0.030	0.350 - 0.500
G	1.92 +0.11 -0.14	1.200 - 1.400
H	0.05 +0.05 -0.037	0.000 - 0.100
J	0.11 +0.07 -0.025	0.080 - 0.150
K	0.89 - 1.00	0.525
L		
R		
S	2.38 ±0.10	2.150 - 2.450

== SOT490 ==
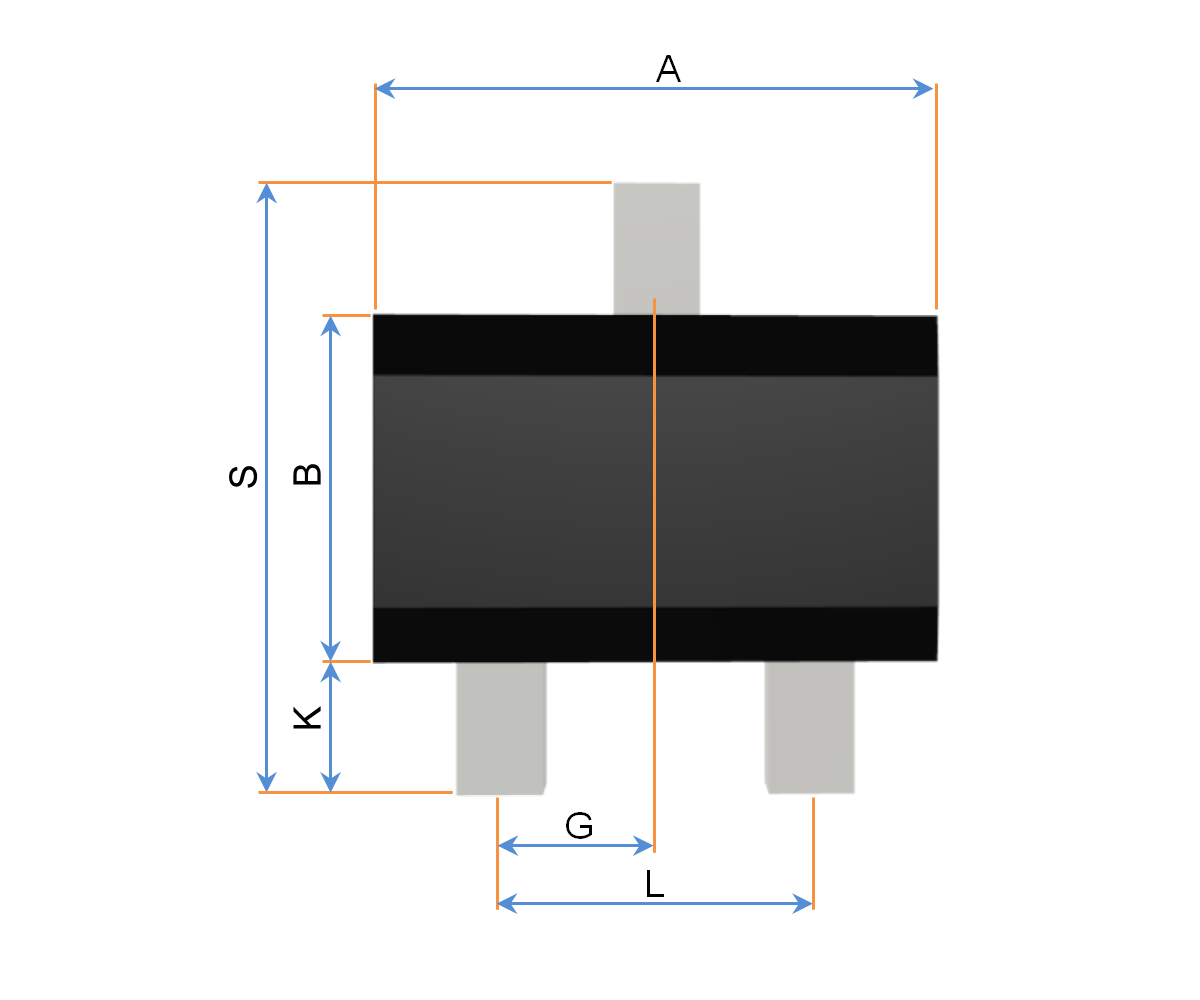
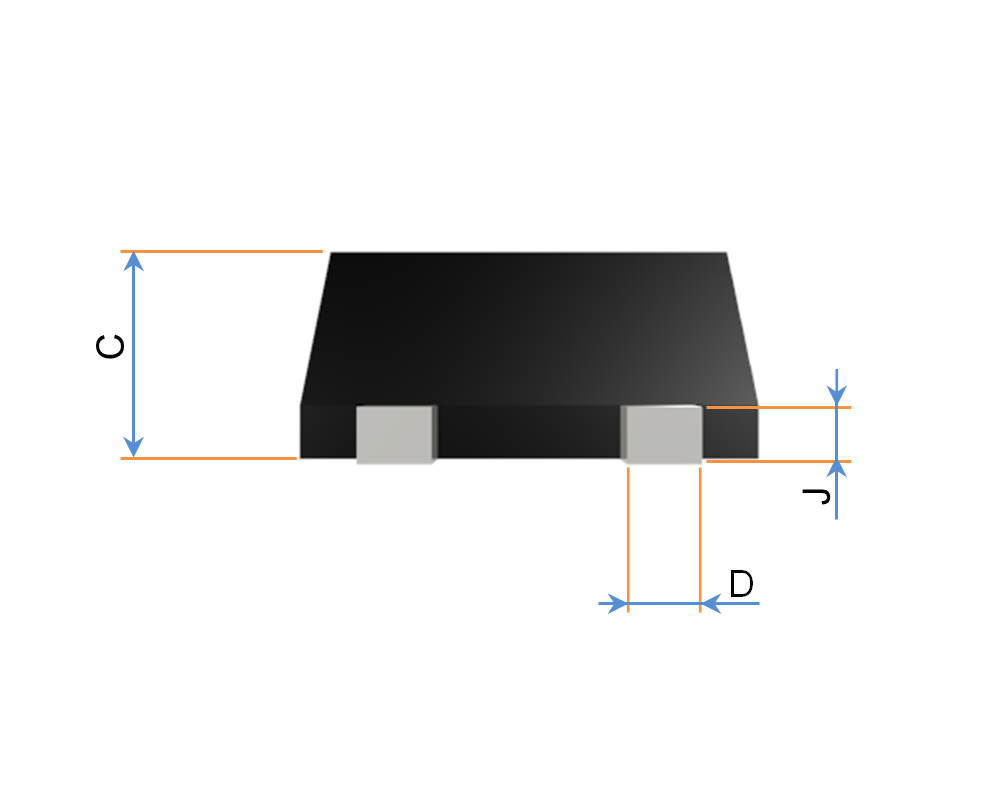
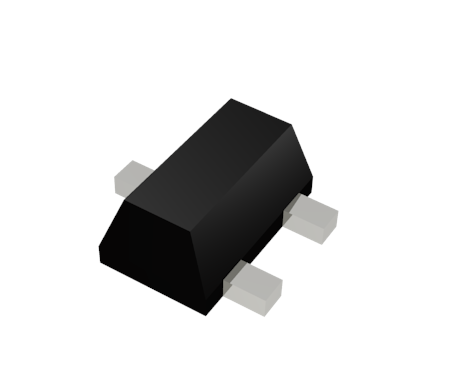

SOT490 (SOT523F, SC89, EMT3F)
	Dimensions (mm)
A	
B	
C	
D	
G	0.5
J	
K	
S	
L	1.0

== SOT89-3 ==
The SOT89-3 electrically only has three leads (contact/pin). The wide lead (tab) is physically part of the middle lead on the other side of the package. Some call this package a SOT89-4, since it visually appears to have four leads when looking down at the part.

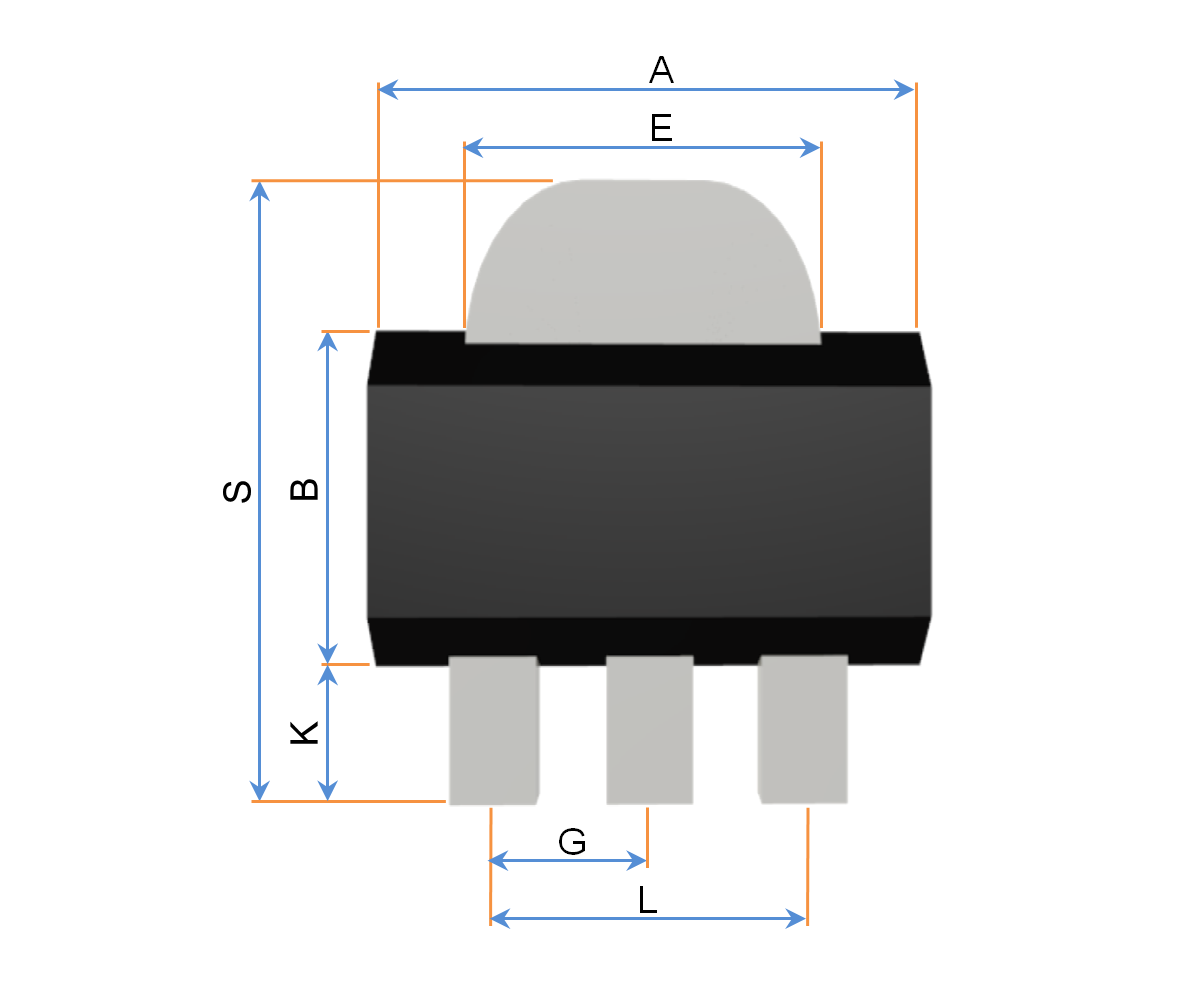
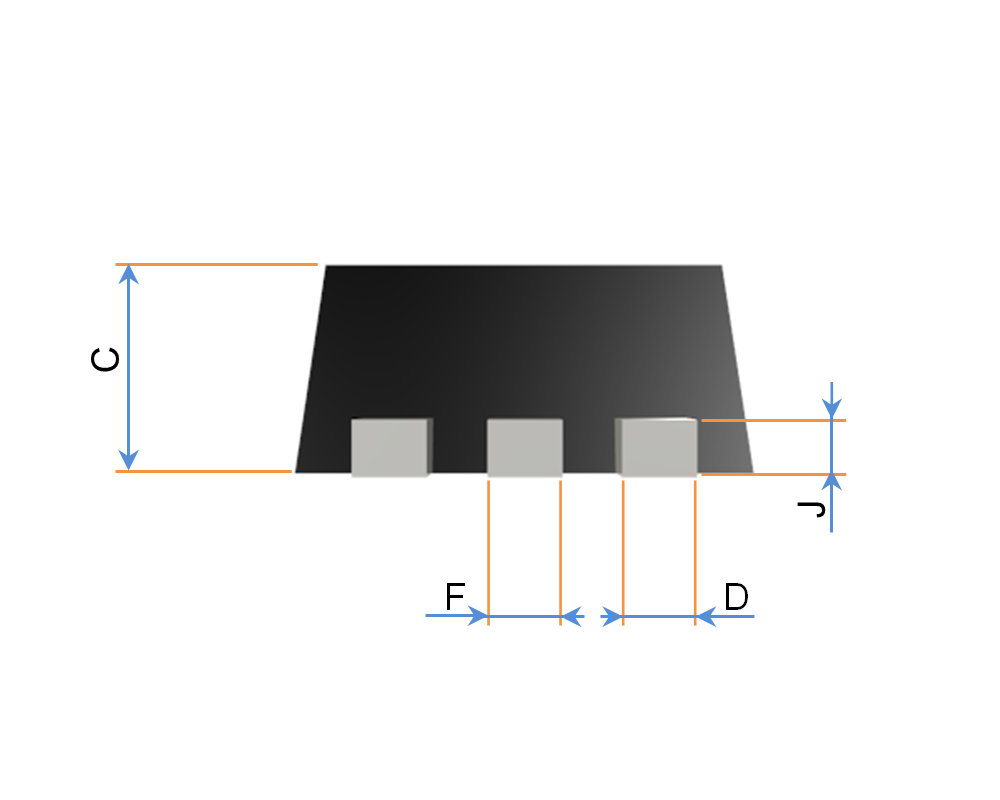
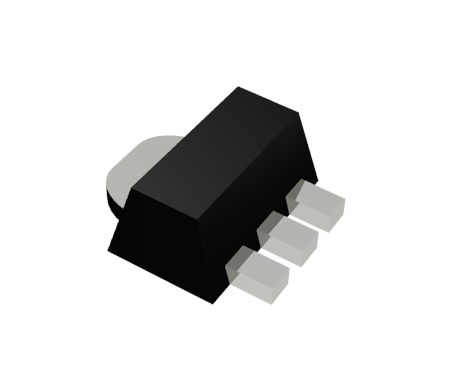

SOT89-3 (TO243AA, SC62, MPT3)
	Dimensions (mm)
A	4.5
B	2.5
C	1.5 ± 0.1
D	
E	1.6
F	
G	1.5
J	
K	
S	
L	3

== SOT89-5 ==
The SOT89-5 electrically only has five leads (contact/pin). The middle lead is physically part of the middle lead on the other side of the package. Some call this package a SOT89-6, since it visually appears to have six leads when looking down at the part.

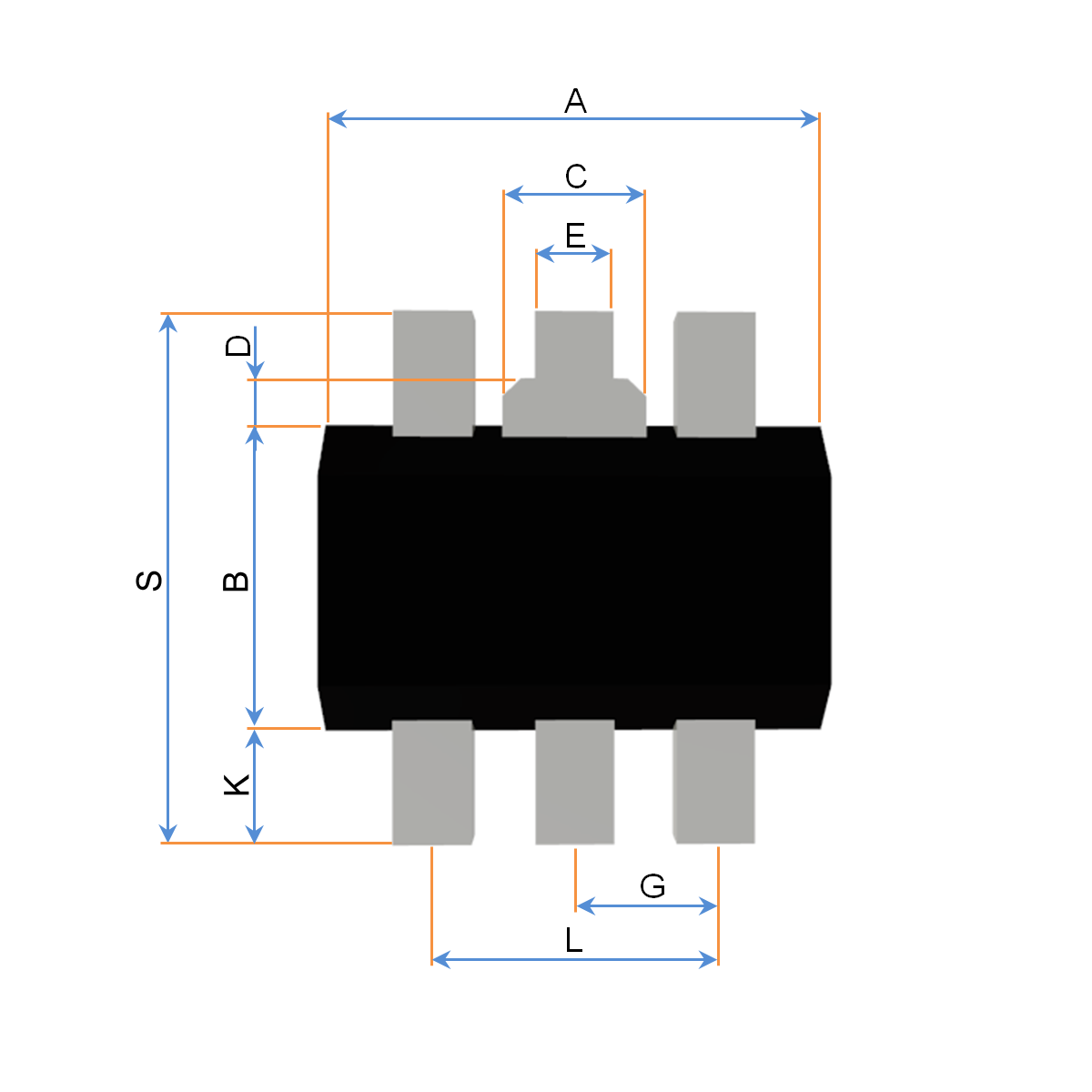
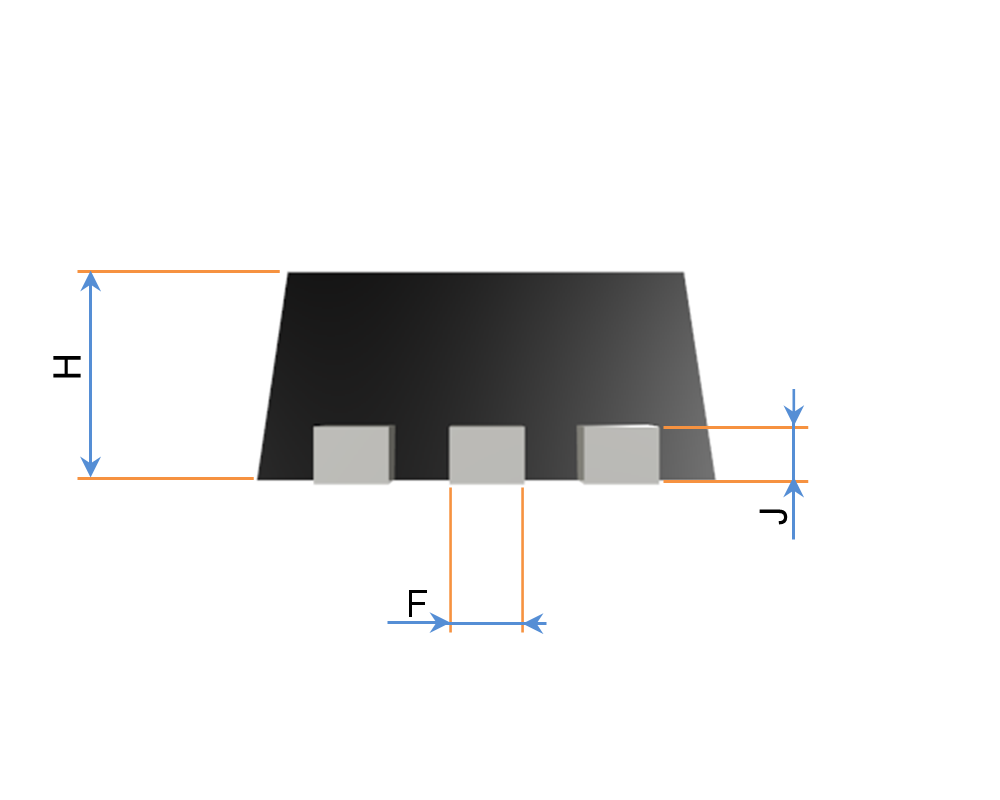
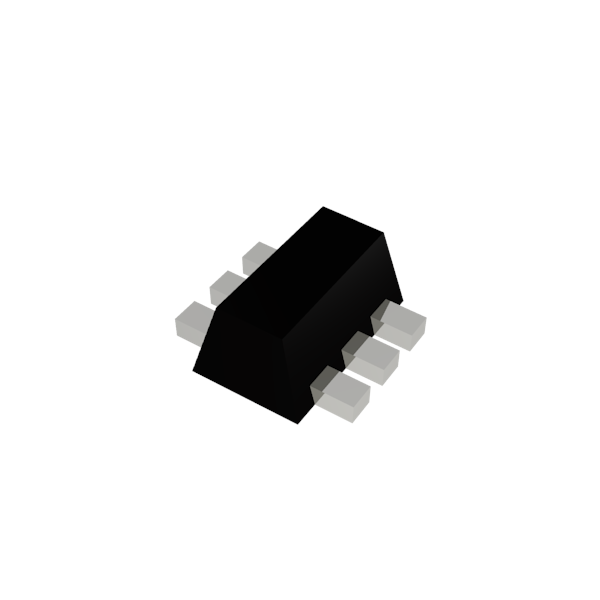
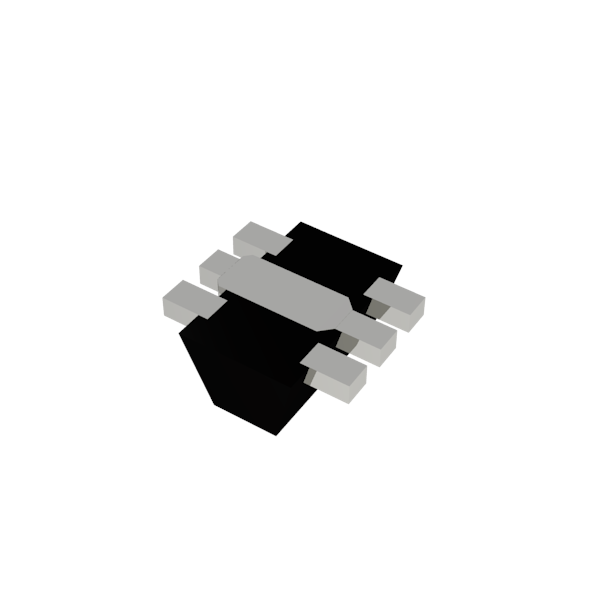

SOT89-5
	Dimensions (mm)
A	4.6
B	2.6
C	1.6
D	
E	
F	
G	1.5
H	
J	
K	
S	
L	

== SOT223 (SOT223-4) ==
The SOT223-4 package is a popular package for voltage regulators. It was introduced by Philips.

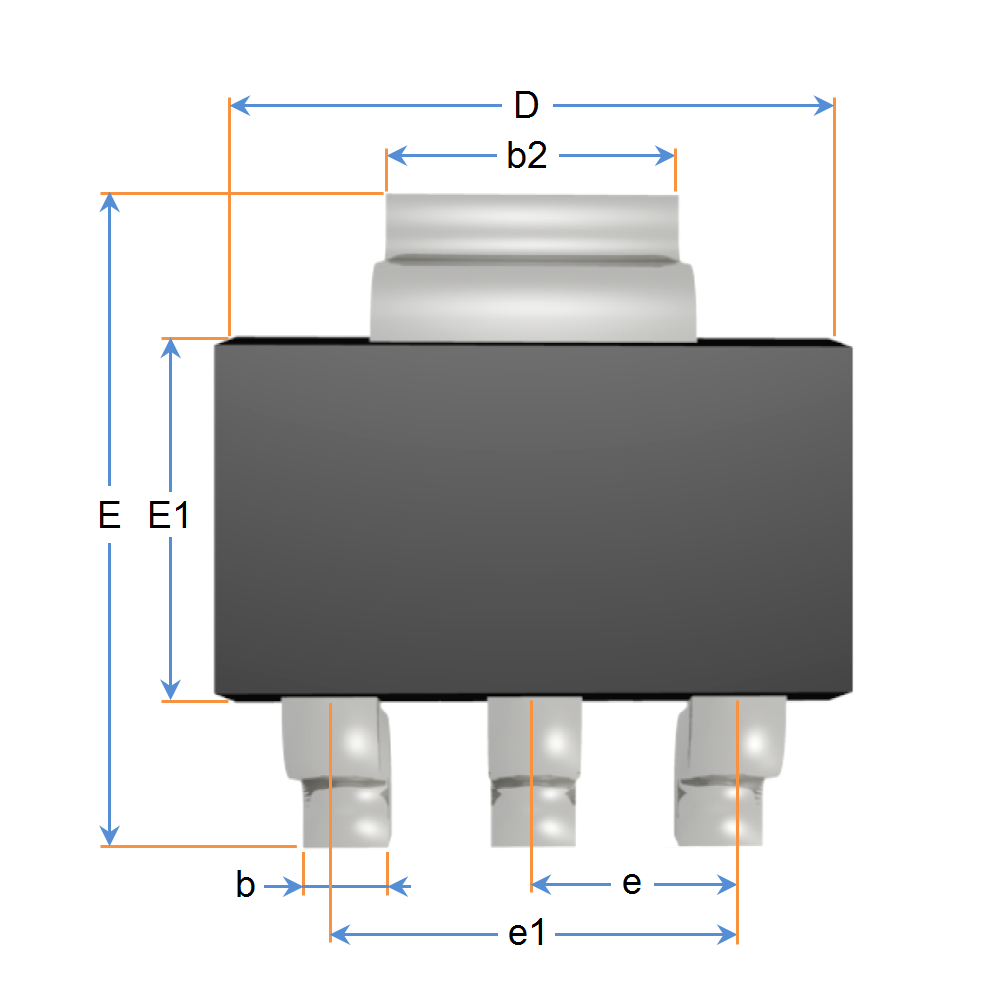
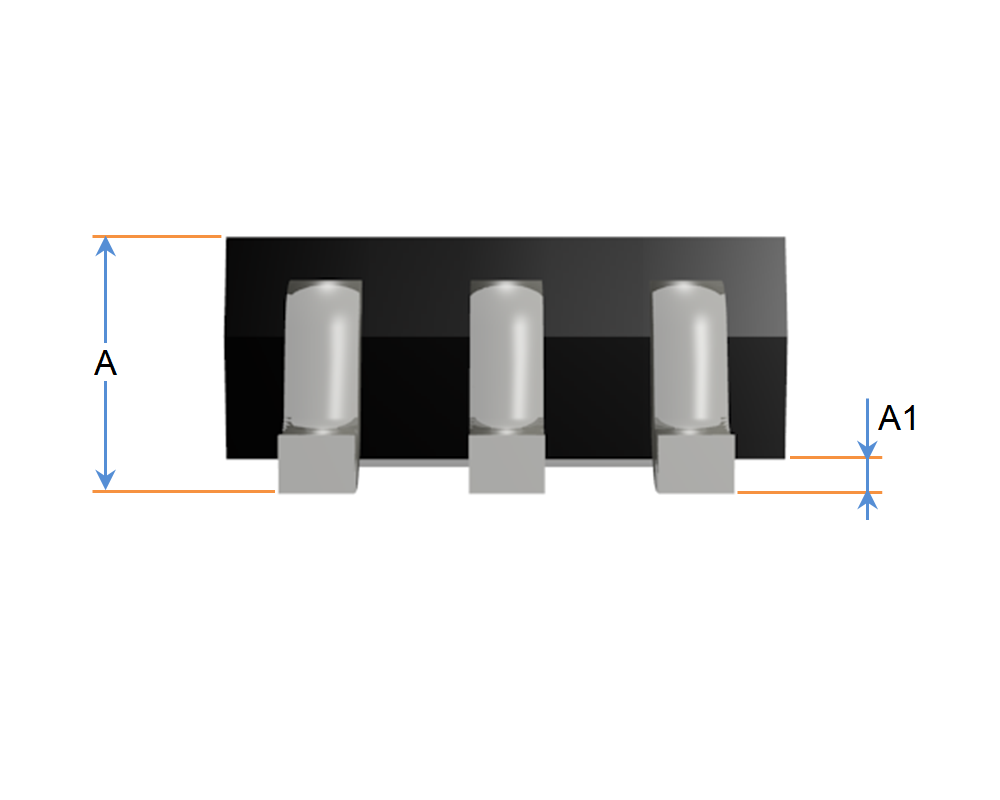
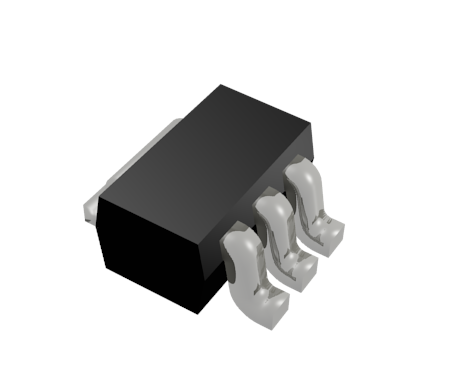

SOT223-4 (SC73, TO261AA)
	Dimensions (mm)		
	Min	Typ	Max
A			1.80
A1		0.02	
b	0.60	0.70	0.80
b2	2.90	3.00	3.10
c	0.24	0.26	0.32
D	6.30	6.50	6.70
e		2.3	
e1		4.6	
E	6.70	7.00	7.30
E1	3.30	3.50	3.70

== SOT223-5 ==
The SOT223-5 package is a popular package for voltage regulators.

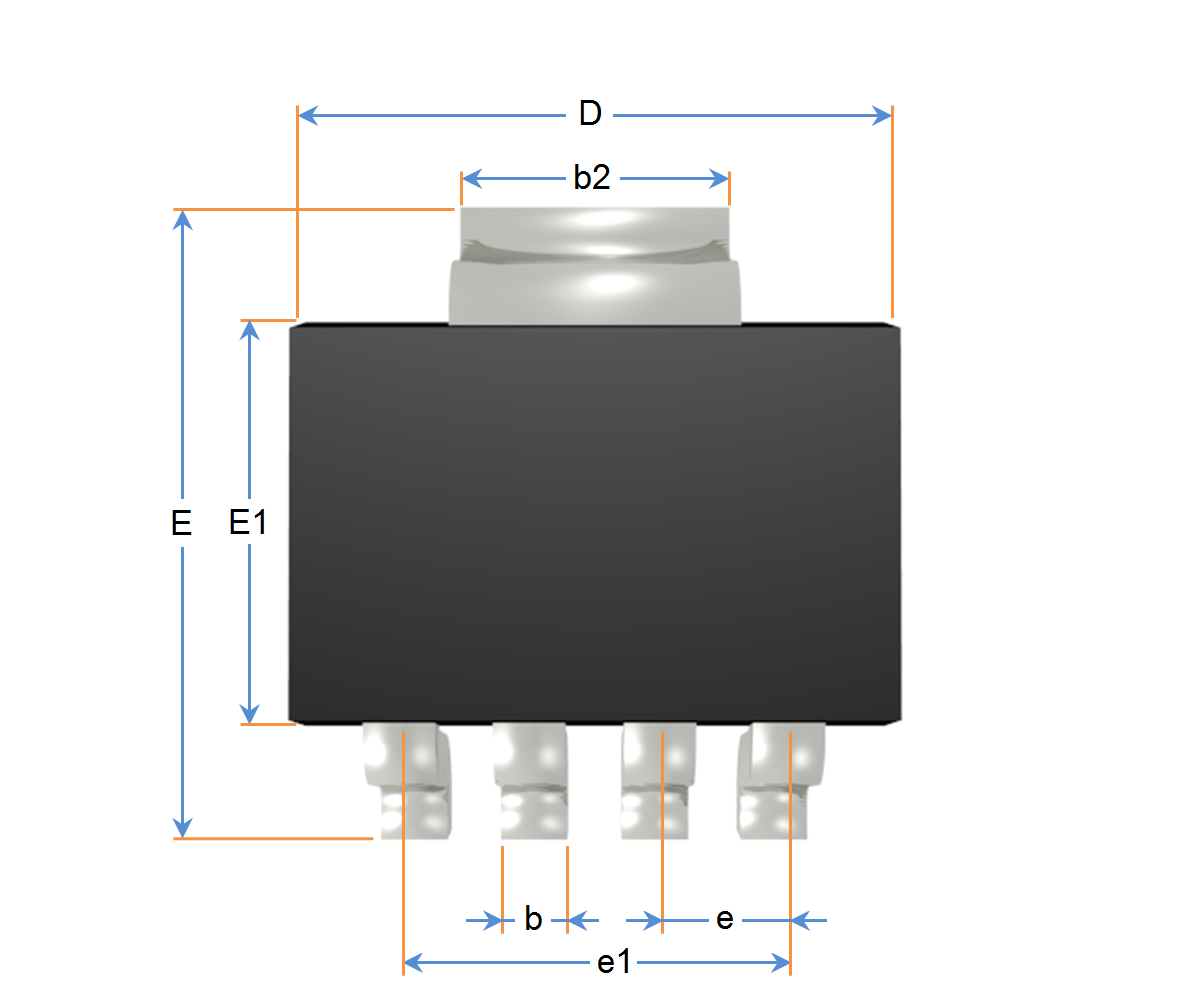
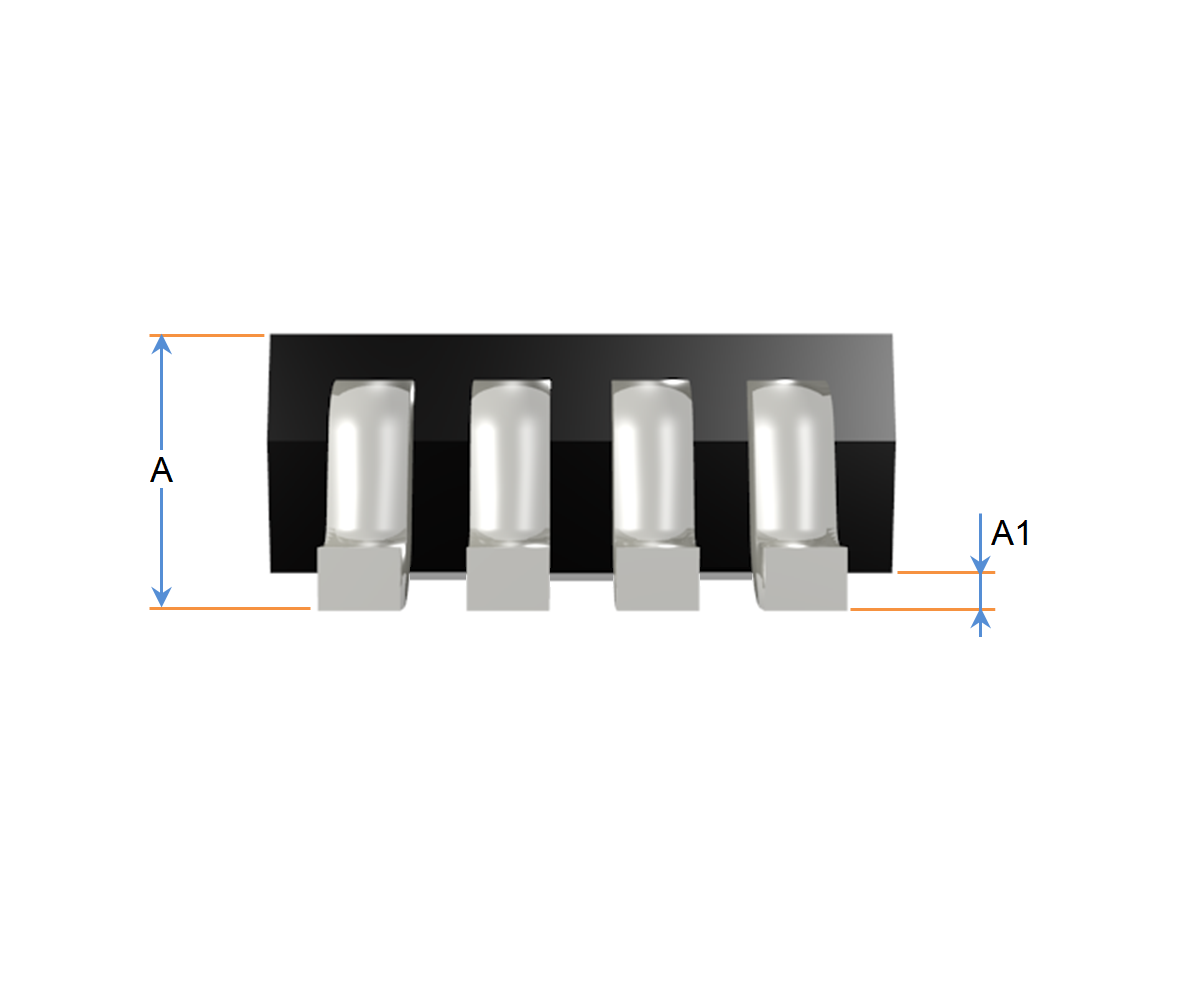
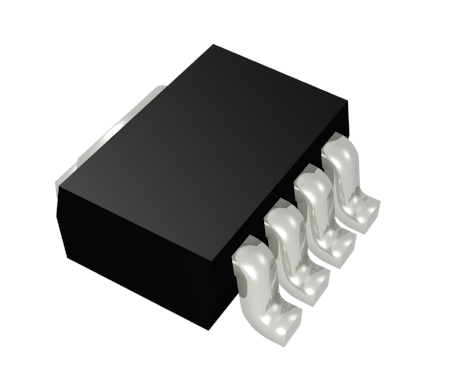

SOT223-5
	Dimensions (mm)		
	Min	Typ	Max
A		1.8	
A1	0.02	0.04	0.10
A2	1.55		1.65
A3	0.87		0.91
b	0.41	0.46	0.51
b2	2.95	3.00	3.05
C	0.24		0.32
D	6.45	6.50	6.55
E	6.86	7.00	7.26
E1	3.45	3.50	3.55
e		1.27	
e1		5.08	
L	0.91		1.14

== SOT223-8 ==
The SOT223-8 package is a popular package for bridged quad transistors.

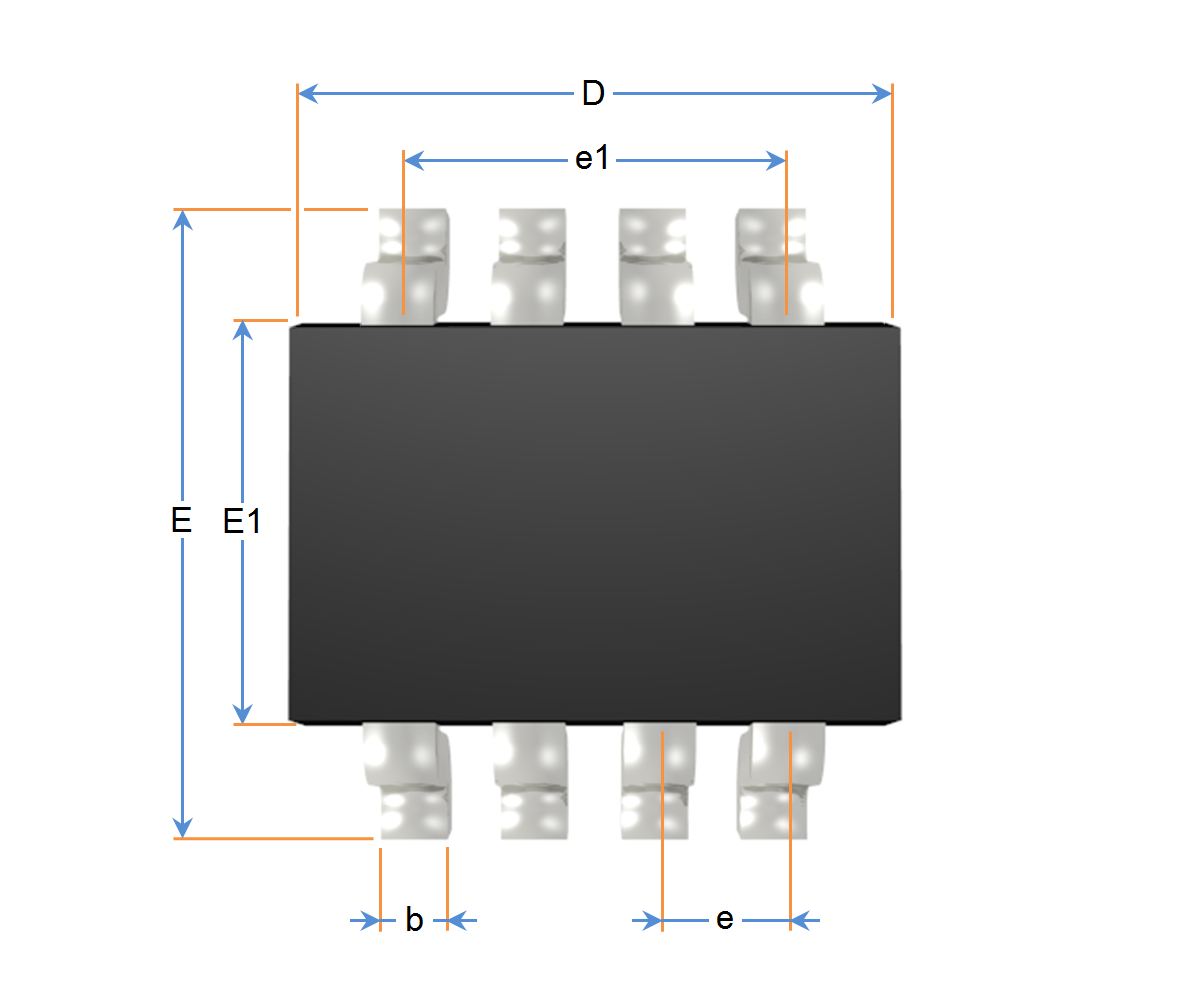
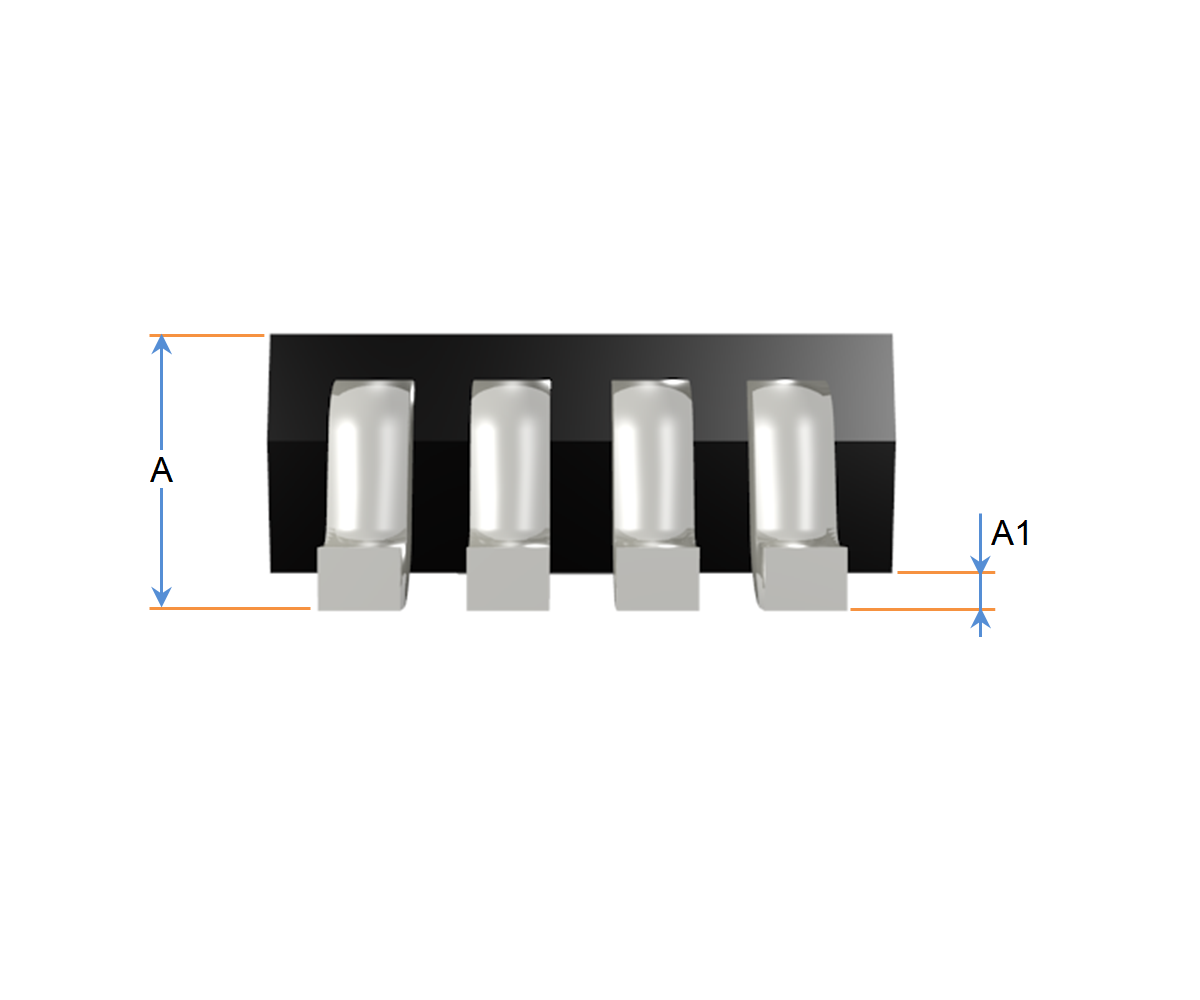
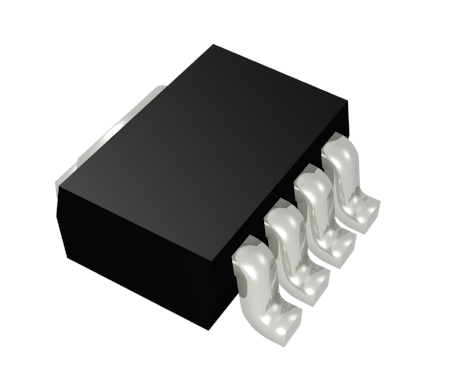

SOT223-8 (SM-8)
	Dimensions (mm)		
	Min	Typ	Max
A		1.60	1.70
A1	0.02	0.04	0.10
b	0.70	0.80	0.90
c	0.24	0.28	0.32
D	6.30	6.60	6.70
e		1.53	
e1		4.59	
E	6.70	7.00	7.30
E1	3.30	3.50	3.70
L	0.75	0.90	1.00
ø		45°	
ø1			15°
ø2		10°	

== See also ==
- List of electronics package dimensions
