= Gain–bandwidth product =

Figure of merit for amplifiers

Adding negative feedback limits the amplification but improves frequency response of the amplifier.

The gain–bandwidth product (designated as GBWP, GBW, GBP, or GB) for an amplifier is a figure of merit calculated by multiplying the amplifier's bandwidth and the gain at which the bandwidth is measured.

For devices such as operational amplifiers that are designed to have a simple one-pole frequency response, the gain–bandwidth product is nearly independent of the gain at which it is measured; in such devices the gain–bandwidth product will also be equal to the unity-gain bandwidth of the amplifier (the bandwidth within which the amplifier gain is at least 1). For an amplifier in which negative feedback reduces the gain to below the open-loop gain, the gain–bandwidth product of the closed-loop amplifier will be approximately equal to that of the open-loop amplifier. "The parameter characterizing the frequency dependence of the operational amplifier gain is the finite gain–bandwidth product (GB)."

== Relevance to design ==
This quantity is commonly specified for operational amplifiers, and allows circuit designers to determine the maximum gain that can be extracted from the device for a given frequency (or bandwidth) and vice versa.

When adding LC circuits to the input and output of an amplifier the gain rises and the bandwidth decreases, but the product is generally bounded by the gain–bandwidth product.

=== Examples ===
If the GBWP of an operational amplifier is 1 MHz, it means that the gain of the device falls to unity at 1 MHz. Hence, when the device is wired for unity gain, it will work up to 1 MHz (GBWP = gain × bandwidth, therefore if BW = 1 MHz, then gain = 1) without excessively distorting the signal. The same device when wired for a gain of 10 will work only up to 100 kHz, in accordance with the GBW product formula. Further, if the maximum frequency of operation is 1 Hz, then the maximum gain that can be extracted from the device is 1×10^{6}.

We can also analytically show that for frequencies $\omega \gg \omega_c$ GBWP is constant.

Let $A_1(\omega)$ be a first-order transfer function given by:

$A_1(\omega)= \frac{{{H_0}}}{{\sqrt {1 + {{\left( {\frac{\omega }{{{\omega_c}}}} \right)}^2}} }}$

We will show that:

$\mathit{GBWP}_{\omega \gg {\omega_c}} = {A_1}(\omega )\cdot\omega \approx \mathrm{const.}$

Proof: We will expand $A_1$ using Taylor series and retain the constant and first term, to obtain:

$\mathit{GBWP} = {A_1}(\omega )\cdot\omega = \frac{{{H_0}}}{{\sqrt {1 + {{\left( {\frac{\omega }{{{\omega_c}}}} \right)}^2}} }}\cdot\omega \simeq \frac{{{H_0}}}{{\sqrt {{{\left( {\frac{\omega }{{{\omega_c}}}} \right)}^2}} }} {{ {{{\left(\omega- {\frac{\omega_c^2 }{{{2\omega}}}} \right)}}} }} = {H_0}\cdot{\omega_c} \left(1- \frac{\omega_c^2 }{2\omega^2} \right) = \mathrm{const.}$

Example for $\omega = 5\cdot \omega_c$

$\mathit{GBWP}\ = \frac{{{H_0}}}{{\sqrt {\frac{{\omega_c^2 + 25{\omega _c}^2}}{{\omega_c^2}}} }}\cdot5{\omega_c} = \frac{5}{{\sqrt {26} }}{H_0}\cdot{\omega_c} = 0.98\cdot{H_0}\cdot{\omega_c}$

Note that the error in this case is only about 2%, for the constant term, and using the second term, $\left(1- \frac{\omega_c^2 }{2\omega^2} \right)$, the error drops to .06%.

== Transistors ==
For transistors, the current-gain–bandwidth product is known as the f_{T} or transition frequency. It is calculated from the low-frequency (a few kilohertz) current gain under specified test conditions, and the cutoff frequency at which the current gain drops by 3 decibels (70% amplitude); the product of these two values can be thought of as the frequency at which the current gain would drop to 1, and the transistor current gain between the cutoff and transition frequency can be estimated by dividing f_{T} by the frequency. Usually, transistors must be used at frequencies well below f_{T} to be useful as amplifiers and oscillators. In a bipolar junction transistor, frequency response declines owing to the internal capacitance of the junctions. The transition frequency varies with collector current, reaching a maximum for some value and declining for greater or lesser collector current.
