= TO-126 =

Standardized geometry for a semiconductor

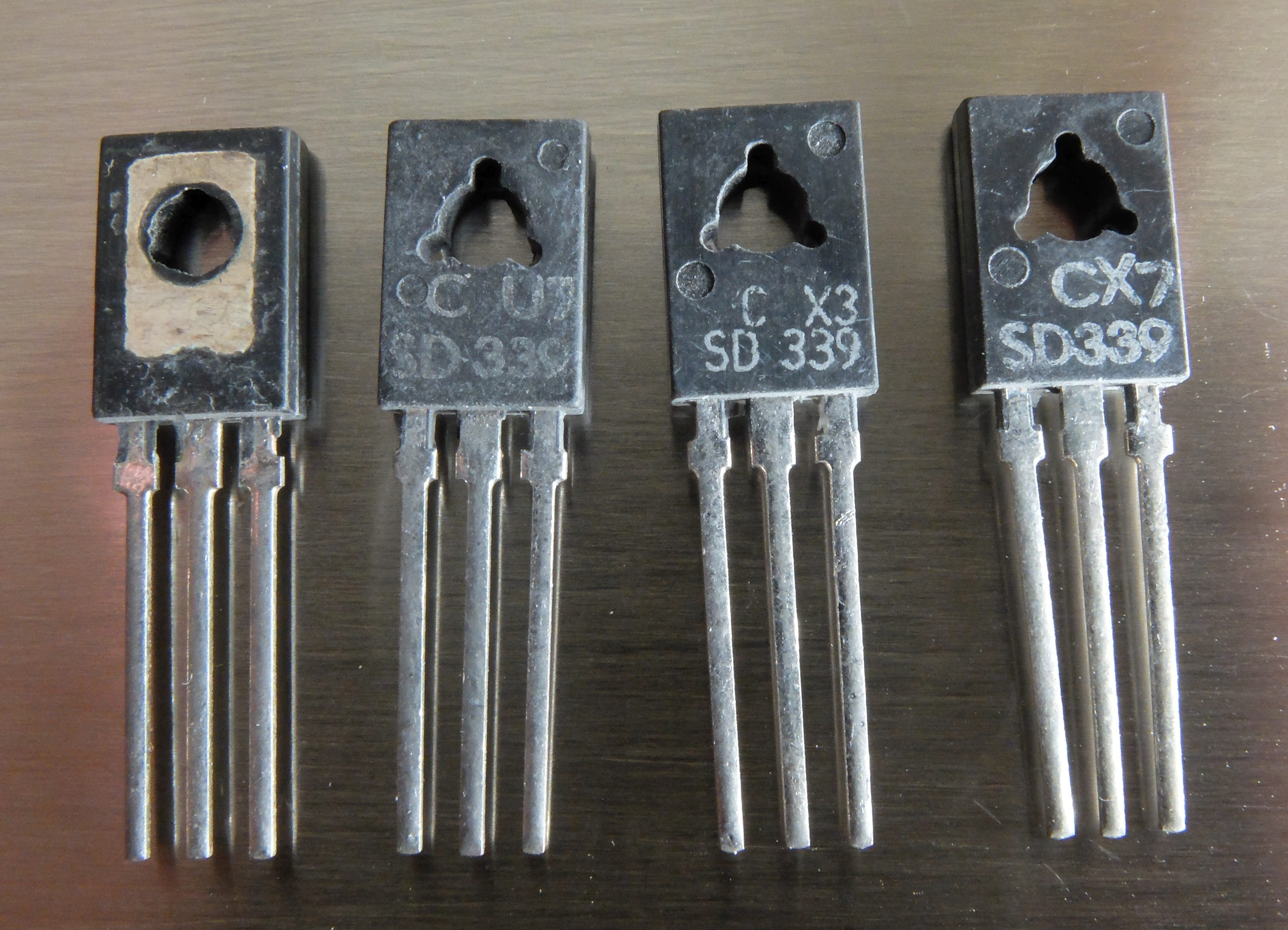
Front and back of a transistor in a TO-126 package.

TO-126 is a type of semiconductor package for devices with three pins, such as transistors. The package is rectangular with a hole in the middle to allow for easy mounting to a board or a heat sink. On one side of the package typically a metal sheet is exposed, with the transistor die bonded to the other side of the metal sheet inside the package. This allows for an efficient heat transfer from the transistor die to an external heat sink but also implies that the metal sheet is electrically connected to the die (for a bipolar junction transistor usually the collector is connected to this metal sheet).

== History and origin ==
The JEDEC TO-126 descriptor is derived from the original full name for the package: Transistor Outline Package, Case Style 126. In the updated JEDEC outline system, the package is numbered as TO-225AA.

STMicroelectronics refers to this package style as SOT-32.

== National Standards ==
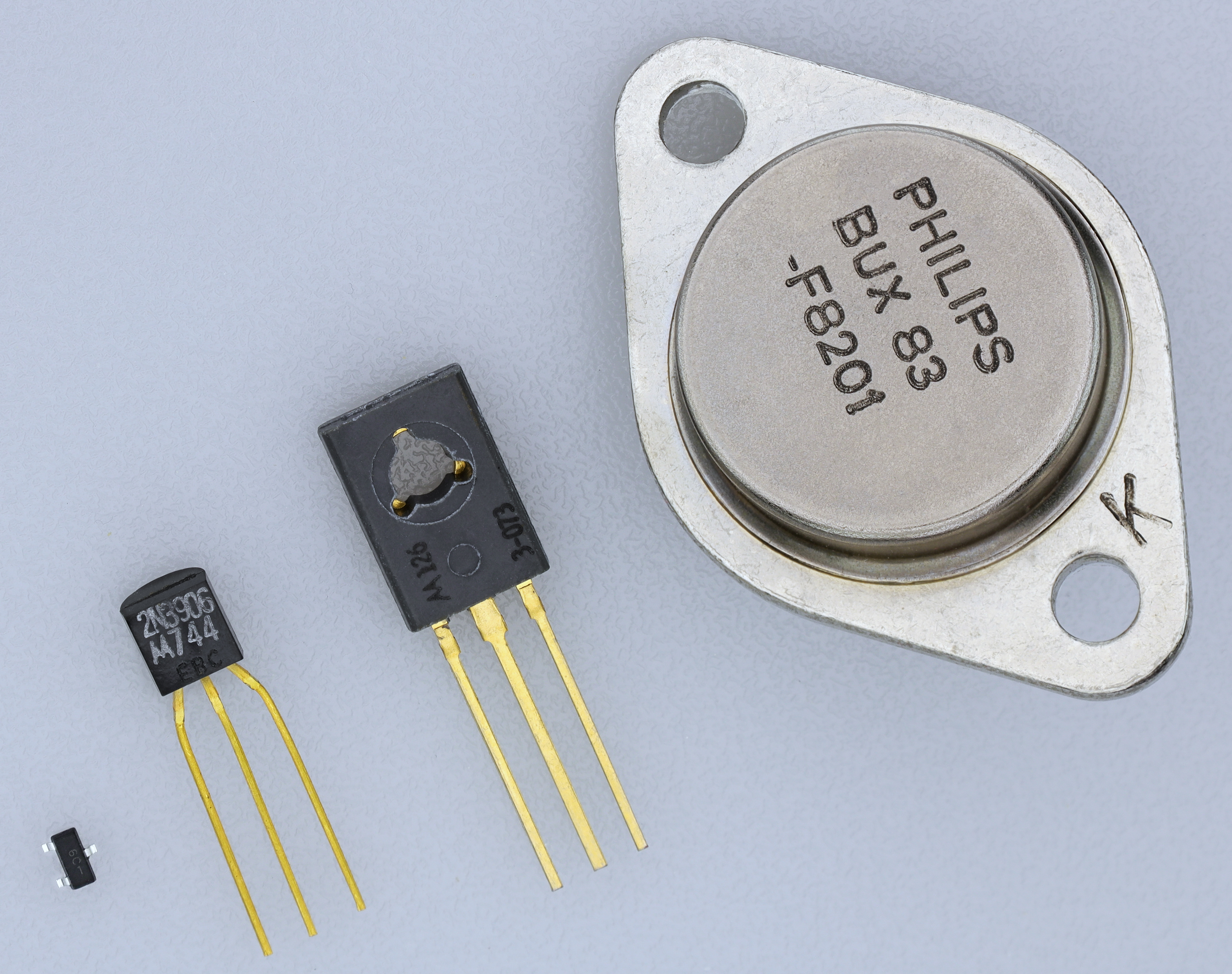
Size comparison of BJT transistor packages, from left to right: SOT-23, TO-92, TO-126, TO-3

Standards organization	Standard	Designation for TO-126
JEDEC	JEP95	TO-225AA
IEC	IEC 60191	A56
DIN	DIN 41869	12A3
Gosstandart	GOST 18472—88	KT-27 (Note: Russian: КТ-27)
Rosstandart	GOST R 57439—2017	KT-27
Kombinat Mikroelektronik Erfurt	TGL 11811	N
Kombinat Mikroelektronik Erfurt	TGL 26713/09	H1B

== See also ==
- TO-66, a metal package with similar power ratings
- TO-220, a plastic package with higher power ratings
