= TO-220 =

Power semiconductor through-hole package

TO-220 front view

TO-220 back view

The TO-220 is a style of electronic package used for high-powered, through-hole components with 0.1 inches (2.54 mm) pin spacing. The "TO" designation stands for "transistor outline". TO-220 packages have three leads. Similar packages with two, four, five or seven leads are also manufactured. A notable characteristic is a metal tab with a hole, used to mount the case to a heatsink, allowing the component to dissipate more heat than one constructed in a TO-92 case. Common TO-220-packaged components include discrete semiconductors such as transistors and silicon-controlled rectifiers, as well as integrated circuits.

== Typical applications ==
The TO-220 package is a "power package" intended for power semiconductors and an example of a through-hole design rather than a surface-mount technology type of package. TO-220 packages can be mounted to a heat sink to dissipate several watts of waste heat. On a so-called "infinite heat sink", this can be 50 W or more. The top of the package has a metal tab with a hole used to mount the component to a heat sink. Thermal compound is often applied between package and heatsink to further improve heat transfer.

The metal tab is often connected electrically to the internal circuitry. This does not normally pose a problem when using isolated heatsinks, but an electrically-insulating pad or sheet may be required to electrically isolate the component from the heatsink if the heatsink is electrically conductive, grounded or otherwise non-isolated. Many materials may be used to electrically isolate the TO-220 package, some of which have the added benefit of high thermal conductivity.

In applications that require a heatsink, damage or destruction of the TO-220 device due to overheating may occur if the heatsink is dislodged during operation.

A heatsinked TO-220 package dissipating 1 W of heat will have an internal (junction) temperature typically 2 to 5 °C higher than the package's temperature (due to the thermal resistance between the junction and the metal tab), and the metal tab of the TO-220 package will typically have a temperature 1 to 60 °C higher than the ambient temperature, depending on the type of heatsink (if any) used.

The junction-to-case thermal resistance of a TO-220 packaged device (which typically matters less than the case-to-ambient thermal resistance), depends on the thickness and the area of the semiconductor die inside the package, typically in a range between 0.5 °C/W and 3 °C/W (according to one textbook) or 1.5 °C/W and 4 °C/W (according to another). The junction-to-case thermal resistance of the LM317 voltage regulator (National Semiconductors, page 5, TO200 version) is 4 °C/W.

If more heat needs to be dissipated, devices in the also widely used TO-247 (or TO-3P) package can be selected. TO-3P has a typical junction-to-ambient (heatsink) thermal resistance of only about 40 °C/W, and its TO-3PF variant a slightly lower one. Further increase of heat dissipation capability is possible with power modules.

When a TO-220 package is used without a heatsink, the package acts as its own heatsink, and the heatsink-to-ambient thermal resistance in air for a TO-220 package is approximately 70 °C/W. The junction-to-air thermal resistance of the LM317 voltage regulator (National Semiconductors, page 5, TO200 version) is 50 °C/W.

== Variations ==
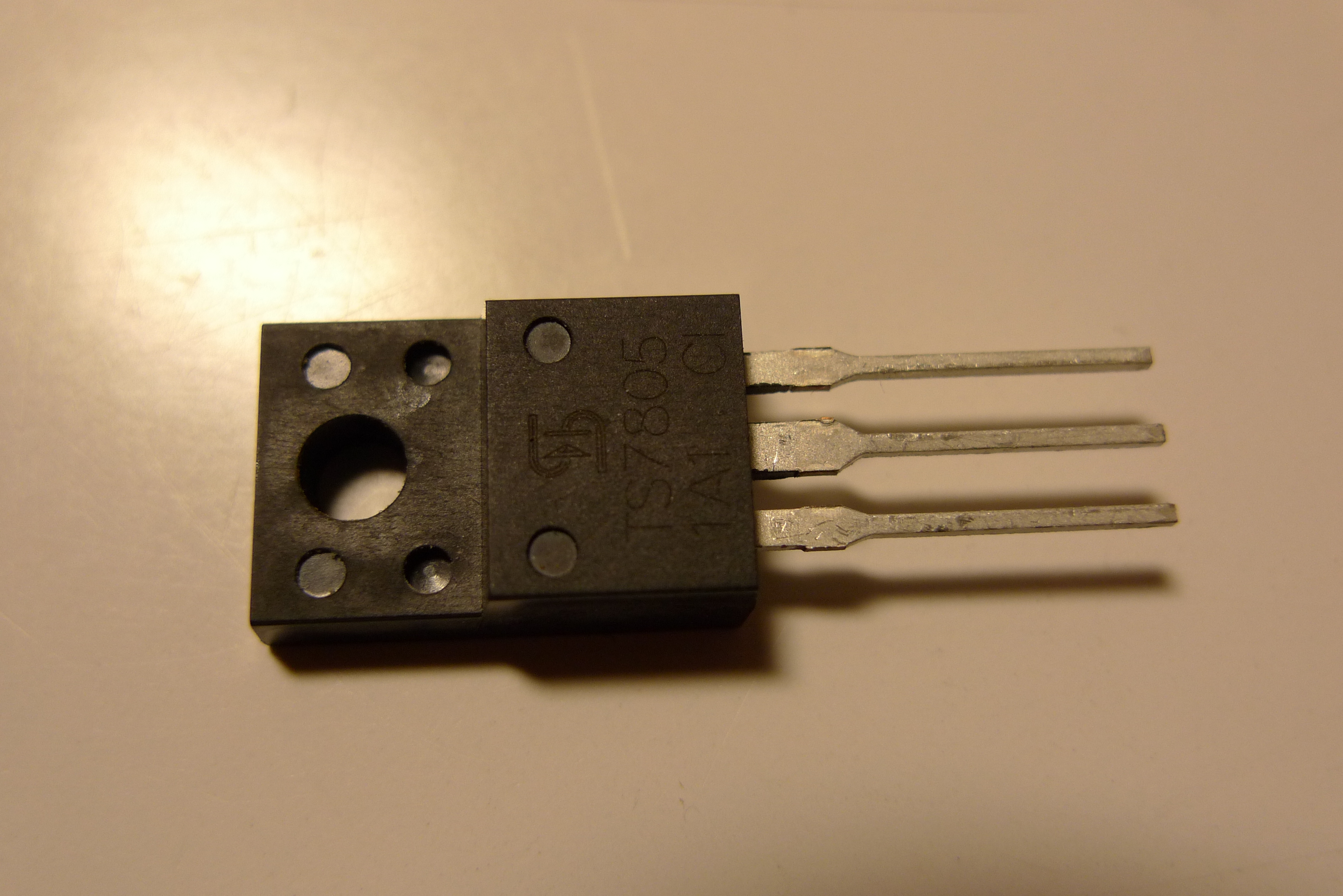
TS7805 linear voltage regulator in a TO-220 variant package with electrically isolated tab.

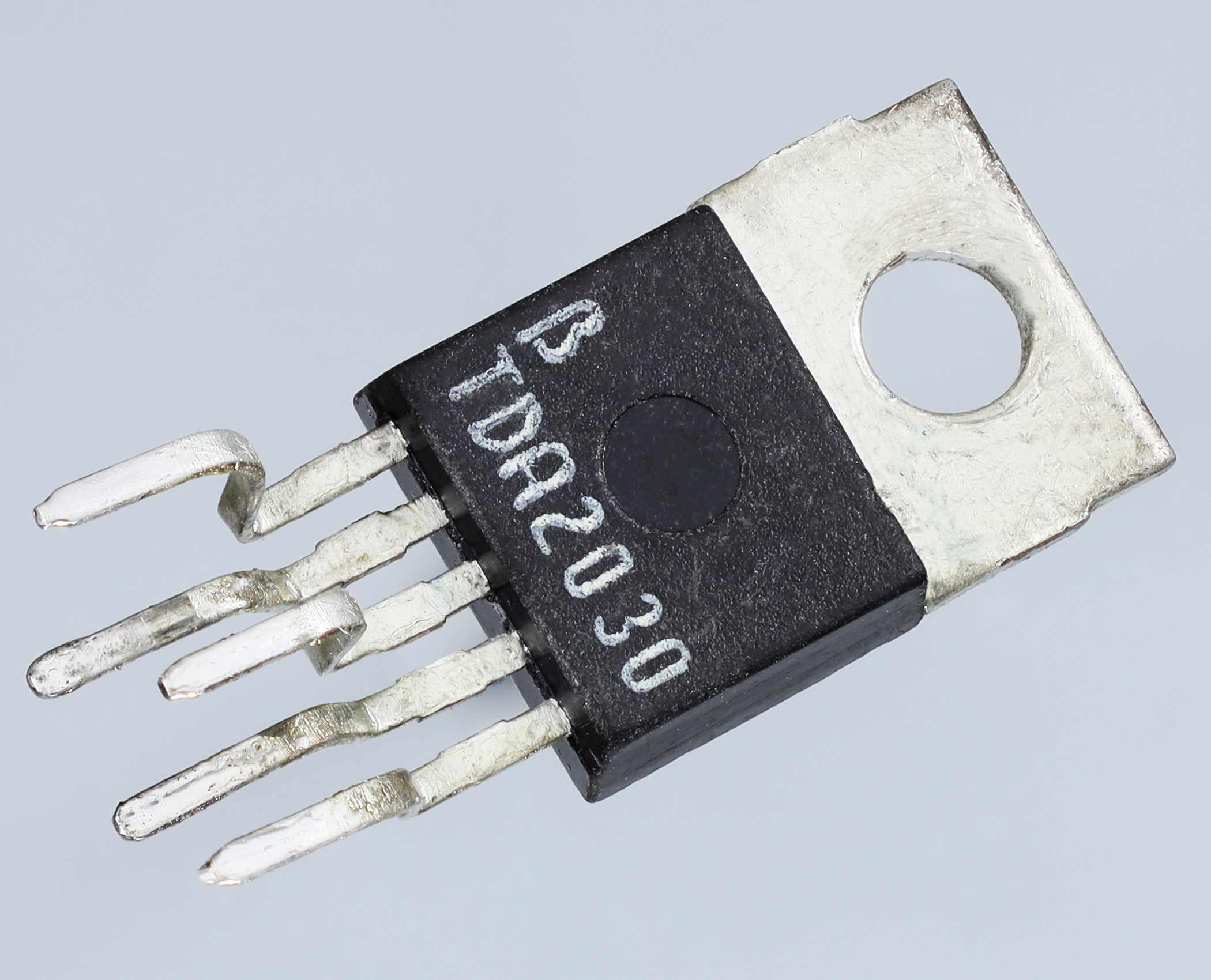
A TDA2030 audio power amplifier IC in a staggered TO-220 with five leads.

The TO-220 family of outlines is defined by the JEDEC organization. There are a number of variations on this outline, such as:

- TO-220F, TO-220FP a 3 lead JEDEC outline which plastic encapsulates the entire body and mounting tab metal that are normally exposed providing electrical insulation which inevitably increases the package thermal resistance relative to the uninsulated metal tab version.
- TO-220AB a 3 lead JEDEC outline
- TO-220AC a 2 lead JEDEC outline

Sometimes the designation is followed by the number of leads, as in TO-220AB-5L for five leads, etc.

There also some vendor-specific variations such as International Rectifier's SUPER-220, which dispenses with the hole in favor of clip-mounting, thus claiming TO-247-like thermal performance in a TO-220 footprint.

== Common components that use the TO-220 package ==
The TO-220 case is found on semiconductor devices handling less than 100 amperes and operating at less than a few hundred volts. These devices operate at DC or relatively low (audio) frequencies, since the TO-220 package is not intended for devices operating at radio frequencies. In addition to bipolar, bipolar Darlington, and power MOSFET transistors, the TO-220 case is also used for fixed and variable linear voltage regulator integrated circuits, and for Schottky diode pairs.

== National Standards ==
Standards organization	Standard	Designation for		
Standards organization	Standard	TO-220-AA	TO-220-AB	TO-220-AC
IEC	IEC 60191		A73A	A74A
DIN	DIN 41869		14A3	
EIAJ / JEITA	ED-7500A	SC45	SC46	–
Gosstandart	GOST 18472—88	–	KT-28-2 (Note: Russian: КТ-28-2)	KT-28-1 (Note: Russian: КТ-28-1)
Rosstandart	GOST R 57439—2017	–	KT-28-2	KT-28-1
Kombinat Mikroelektronik Erfurt	TGL 26713/09	–	H2B1	H2A1

== Related packages ==
- TO-257 is a hermetically sealed metal package that is otherwise considered equivalent to TO-220.
- TO-220F also known as the SOT186 and SC67 is TO-220 like package, where the heatsink mounting tab has been encased in the plastic.

== See also ==
- TO-3, a metal package with similar power ratings
- TO-126, a plastic package with lower power ratings
- TO-263, the surface-mount equivalent of the TO-220
