= TO-66 =

Smaller variant of the TO-3 package

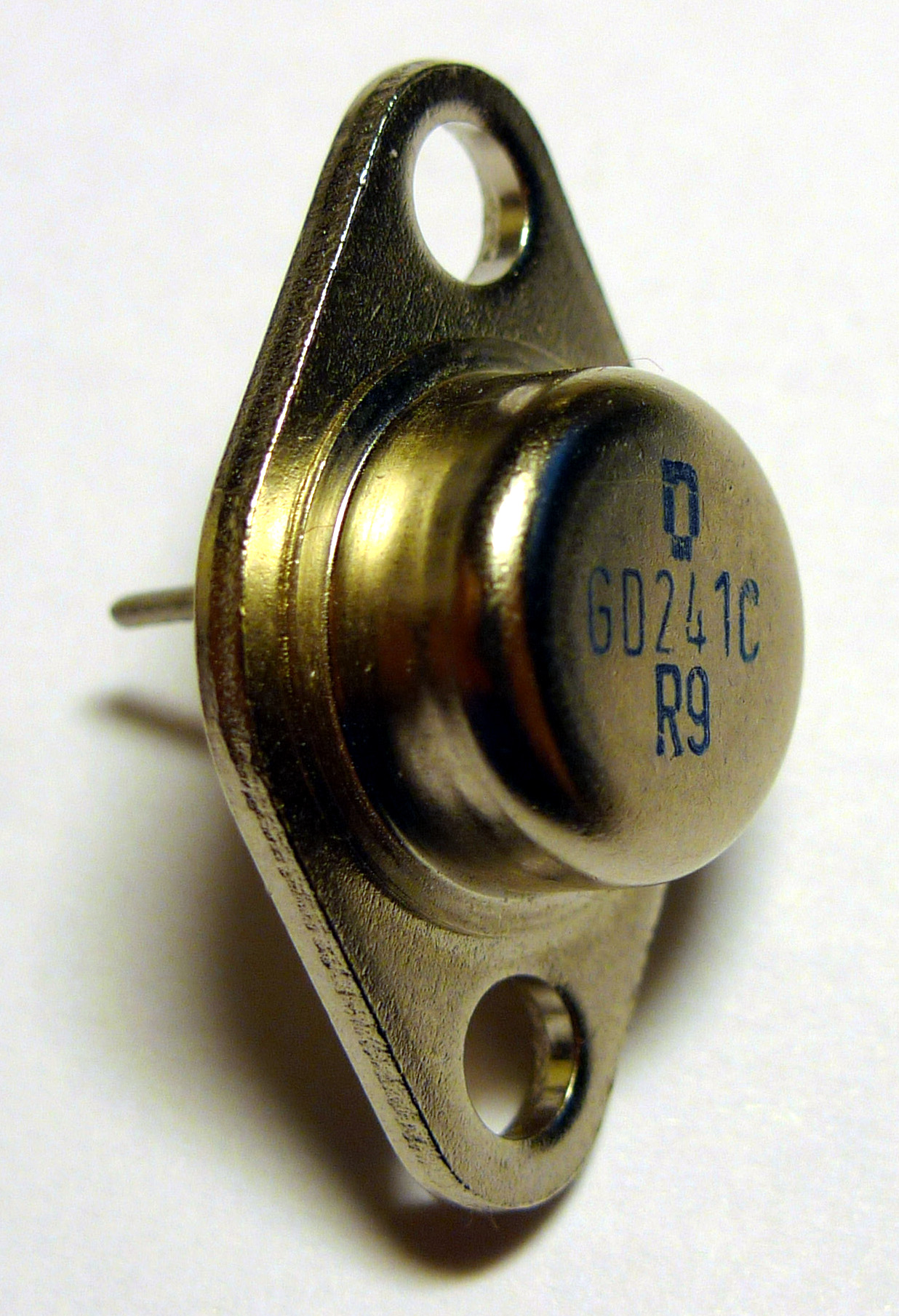
GD241 PNP transistor in a TO-66 package.

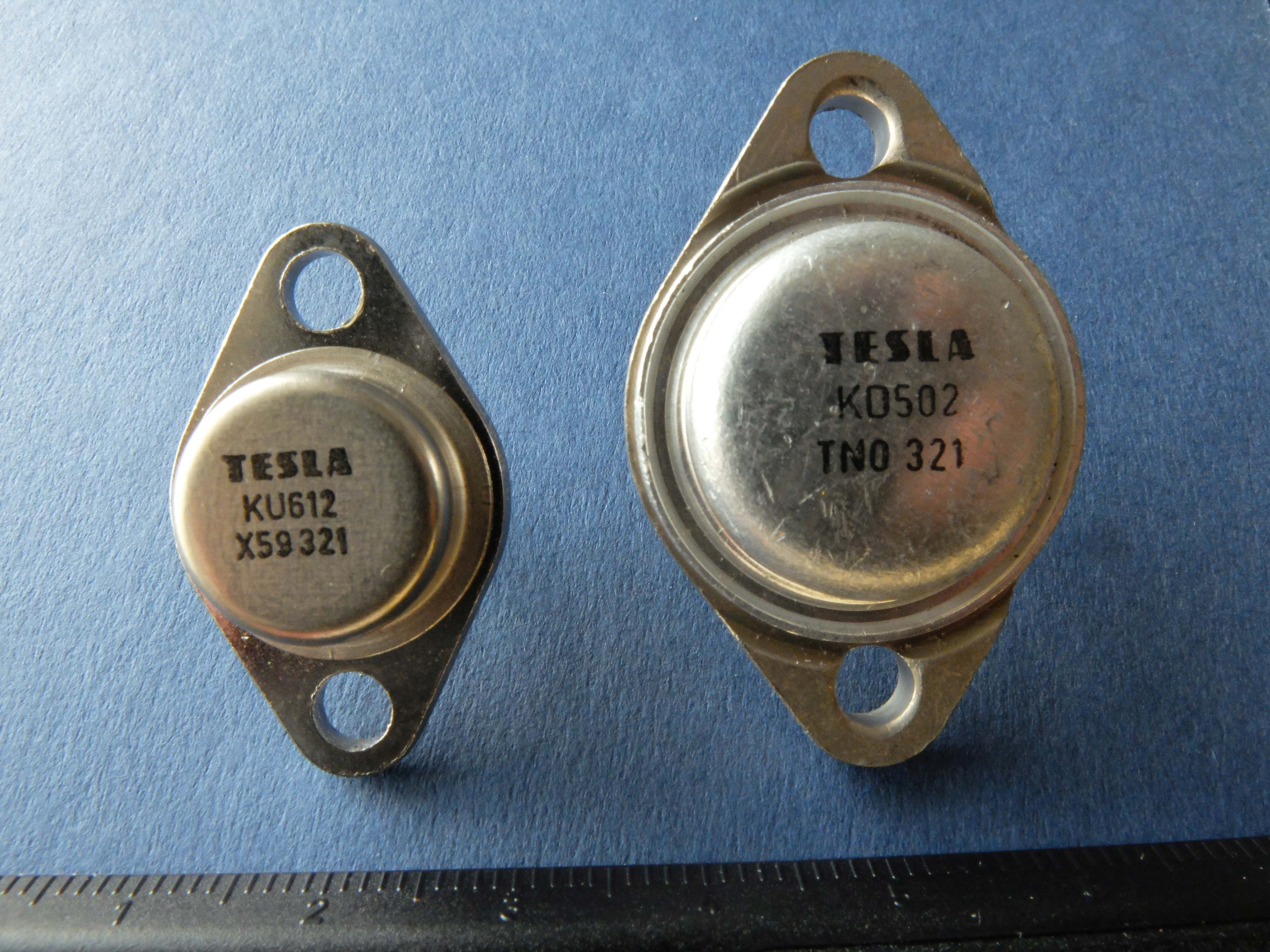
Comparison between the TO-66 (left) and TO-3 (right) packages.

TO-66 is a type of semiconductor package for devices with three connections, such as transistors. The shape is similar to the TO-3 package, but the size is smaller. The TO-66 package is made entirely of metal and is commonly used by silicon controlled rectifiers and power transistors. In Europe, it was popularly used by the complementary germanium power transistors AD161/AD162.

The TO-66 package consists of a diamond-shaped base plate with diagonals of 31.4 mm (1.24 in) and 19.0 mm (0.75 in). The plate has two mounting holes on the long diagonal, with the centers spaced 23 mm (0.91 in) apart. A cap attached to one side of the plate and under which the semiconductor chip is located, brings the total height to up to 8.63 mm (0.340 in). Two pins on the other side of the plate are isolated from the package by individual glass-metal seals. The metal case forms the third connection (in the case of a bipolar junction transistor this is typically the collector).

== Variants ==
TO-66 is often used as a synonym for any of the variants that have the same footprint (i.e. position of mounting holes and pins) as TO-66.

=== TO-123 ===
TO-123 reduces the maximum thickness of the base plate from 1.90 mm (0.075 in) to 1.02 mm (0.040 in).

=== TO-124 ===
TO-124 increases the maximum thickness of the base plate from 1.90 mm (0.075 in) to 2.59 mm (0.102 in) and the maximum total height from 8.63 mm (0.340 in) to 9.02 mm (0.355 in).

=== TO-213 ===
TO-213 is intended to replace previous definitions of flange-mounted packages with a 5.08 mm (0.200 in) pin spacing. The different outlines are now defined as variants of TO-213: TO-66 is renamed to TO-213-AA, TO-123 to TO-213-AB, TO-124 to TO-213-AC.

== National standards ==
Standards organization	Standard	Designation for		
Standards organization	Standard	TO-66	TO-123	TO-124
JEDEC	JEP95	TO-213-AA	TO-213-AB	TO-213-AC
IEC	IEC 60191 (Note: These standards have separate drawings for the package case and the base.)			C13/B16 (Note: The maximum height is 9.8 mm (0.39 in).)
EIAJ / JEITA	ED-7500A	TC-16A/TB-12	–	TC-9/TB-12
British Standards	BS 3934			SO-55/SB2-5
Gosstandart	GOST 18472—88	–	–	KT-8 (Note: Russian: КТ-8)
Rosstandart	GOST R 57439	–	–	KT-8
Kombinat Mikroelektronik Erfurt	TGL 11811	–	–	D
Kombinat Mikroelektronik Erfurt	TGL 26713/11	–	–	L2B

== See also ==
- TO-126 - a plastic package with power ratings similar to TO-66
