= TO-3 =

Metal can semiconductor package for power semiconductors

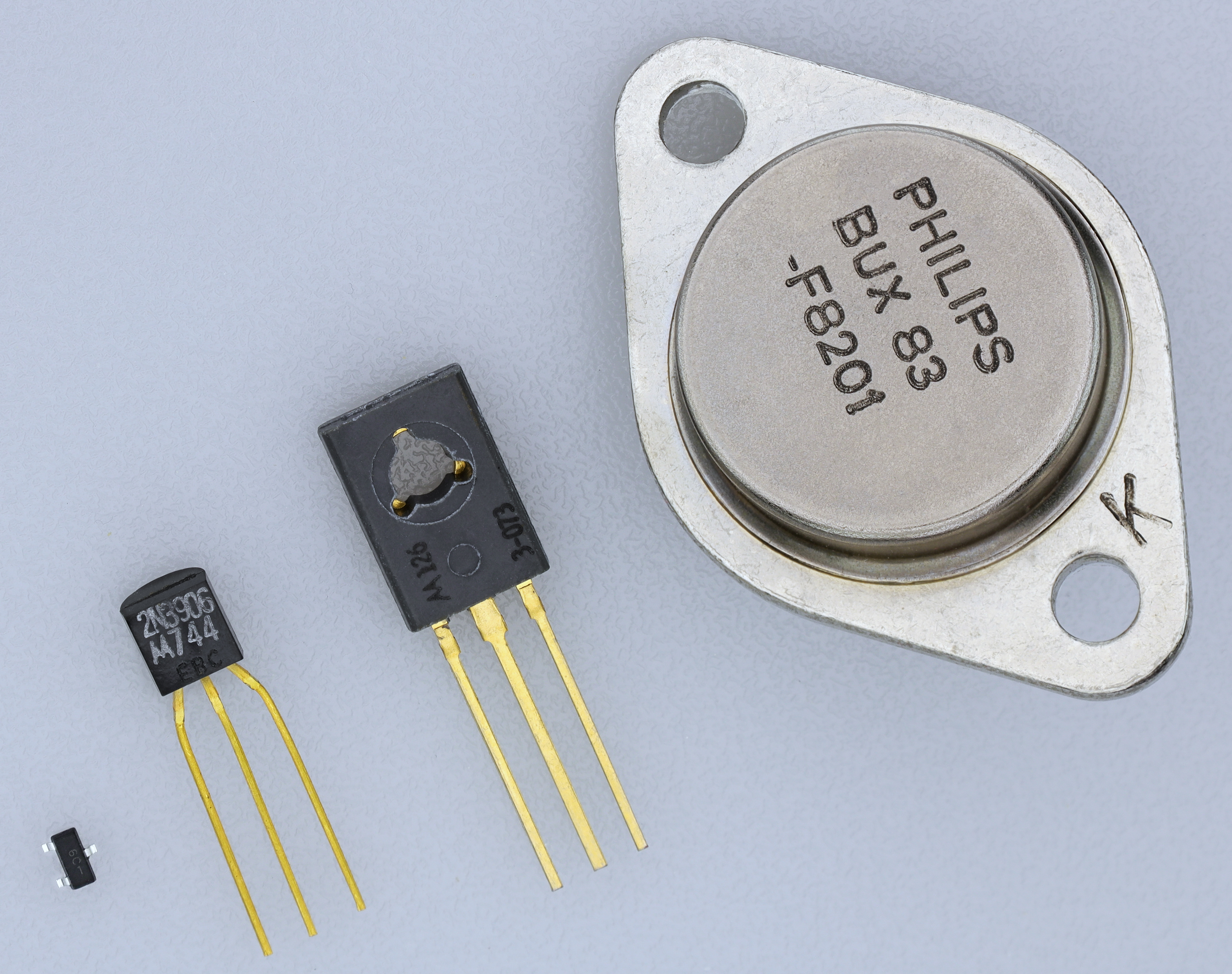
Size comparison of BJT transistor packages, from left to right: SOT-23, TO-92, TO-126, TO-3

3D model of TO-3 package

In electronics, TO-3 is a designation for a standardized metal semiconductor package used for power semiconductors, including transistors, silicon controlled rectifiers, and, integrated circuits. TO stands for "Transistor Outline" and relates to a series of technical drawings produced by JEDEC.

The TO-3 case has a flat surface which can be attached to a heatsink, normally via a thermally conductive but electrically insulating washer. The design originated at Motorola around 1955 from a group headed by Dr. Virgil E. Bottom. who was director of research of the Motorola Semiconductor Division. The first use of this design was for the germanium alloy-junction power transistor 2N176 – the first power transistor to be put into quantity production. The lead spacing was originally intended to allow plugging the device into a then-common tube socket.

== Typical applications ==
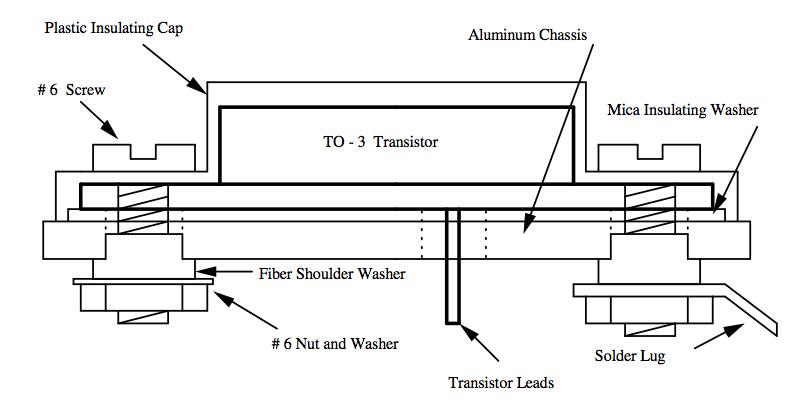
Typical TO-3 mounting profile, with insulator from chassis

The metal package can be attached to a heat sink, making it suitable for devices dissipating several watts of heat. Thermal compound is used to improve heat transfer between the device case and the heat sink. Since the device case is one of the electrical connections, an insulator may be required to electrically isolate the component from the heatsink. Insulating washers may be made of mica or other materials with good thermal conductivity.

The case is used with high-power and high-current devices, on the order of a few tens of amperes current and up to a hundred watts of heat dissipation. The case surfaces are metal for good heat conductivity and durability. The metal-to-metal and metal-to-glass joints provide hermetic seals that protect the semiconductor from liquids and gases.

Compared with equivalent plastic packages, the TO-3 is more costly. The spacing and dimensions of the case leads make it unsuitable for higher frequency (radio frequency) devices.

== Construction ==
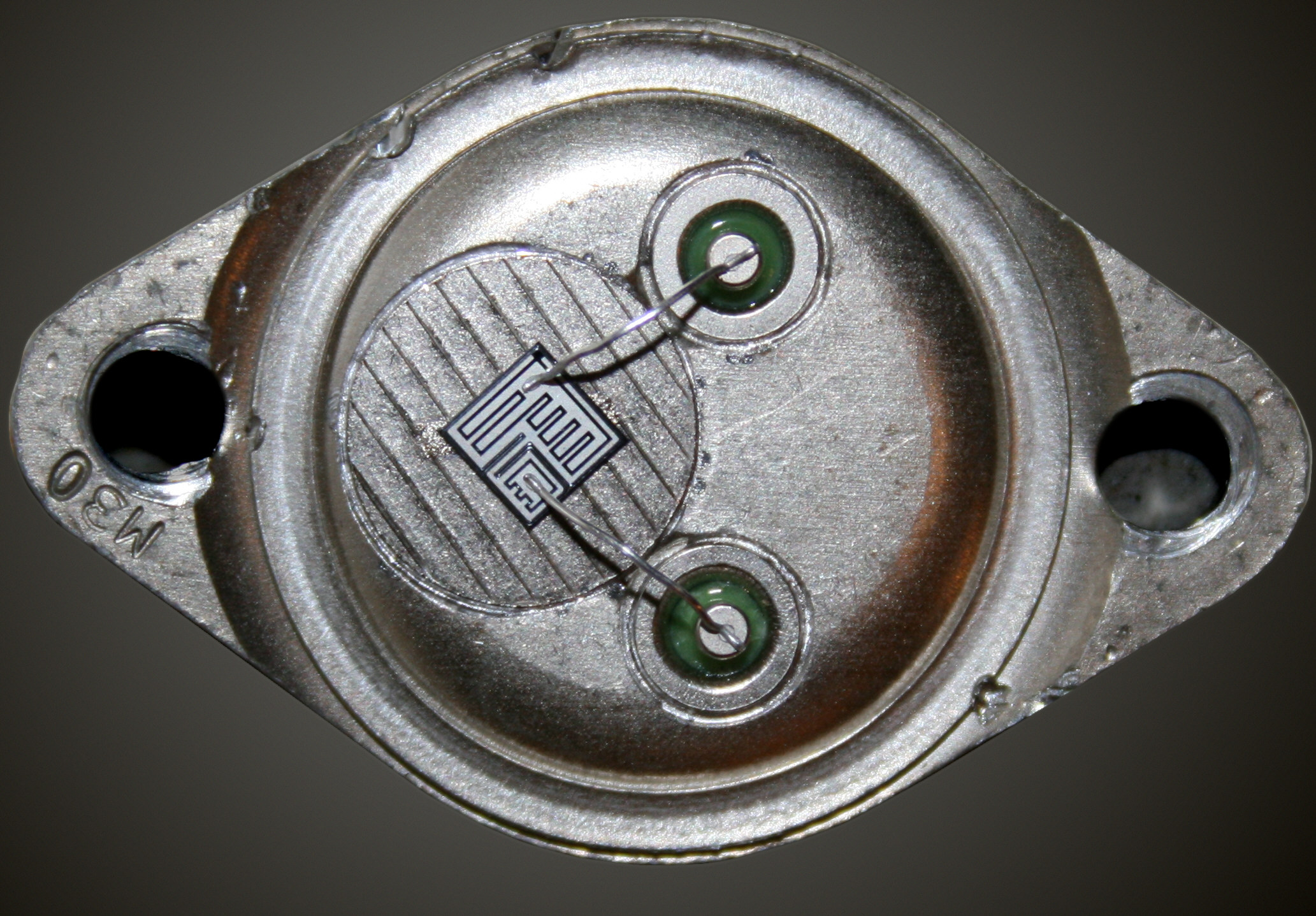
Inside of an MJ1000 Darlington transistor in TO-3 package

The semiconductor die component is mounted on a raised platform on a metal plate, with the metal can welded on top of it; providing high heat conductivity and durability. The metal case is connected to the internal device and the leads are connected to the die with bonding wires.

The TO-3 package consists of a diamond-shaped base plate with diagonals of 40.13 mm (1.580 in) and 27.17 mm (1.070 in). The plate has two mounting holes on the long diagonal, with the centers spaced 30.15 mm (1.187 in) apart. The cap attached to one side of the plate brings the total height to up to 11.43 mm (0.450 in). Two pins on the other side of the plate are isolated from the package by individual glass-metal seals. The metal case forms the third connection (in the case of a bipolar junction transistor this is typically the collector).

== Variants ==
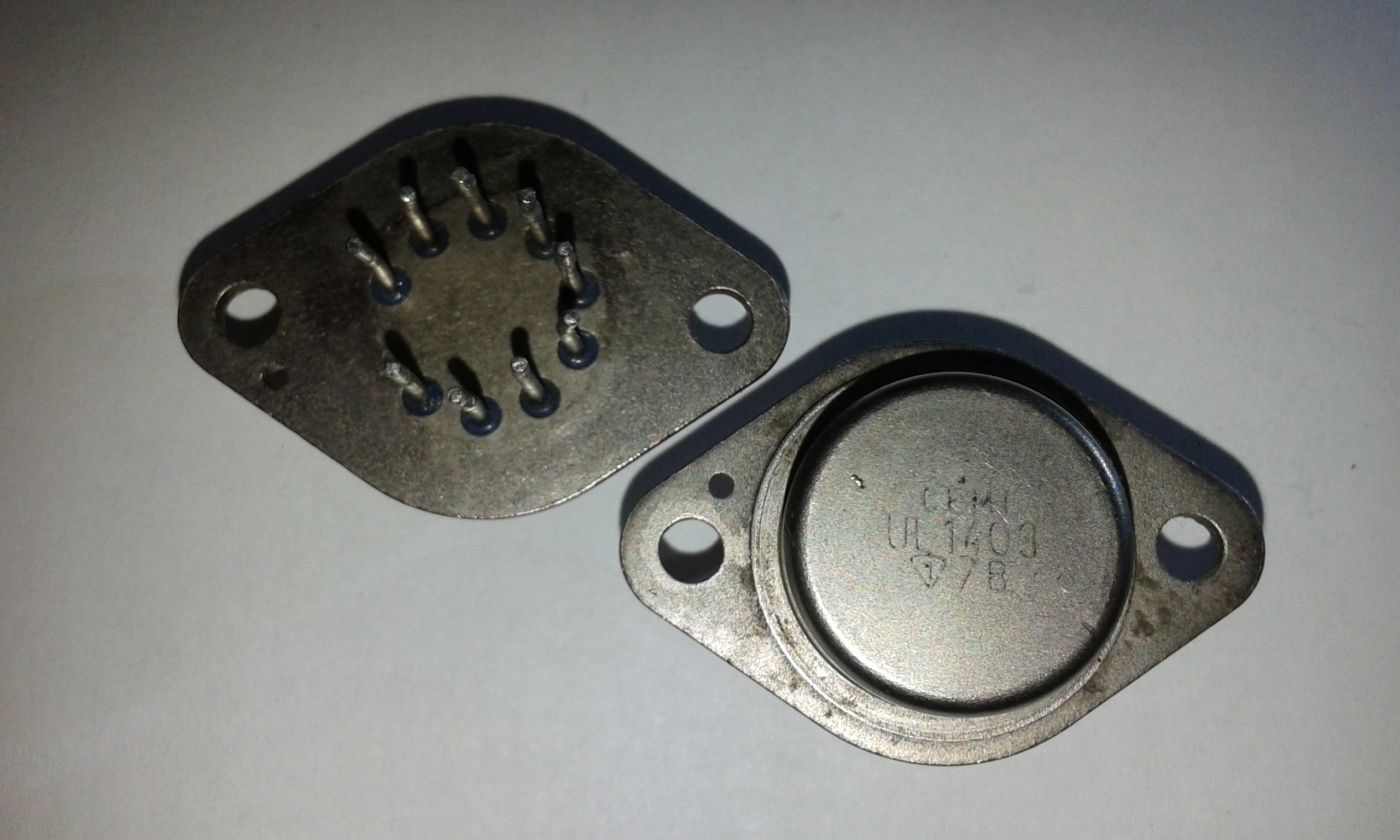
Power amplifier integrated circuit (CEMI UL1403) in a TO-3 package variant

TO-3 package variants for integrated circuits can have more than two leads. The height of the cap and the thickness of the leads differs between variants of the TO-3 package.

=== TO-41 ===
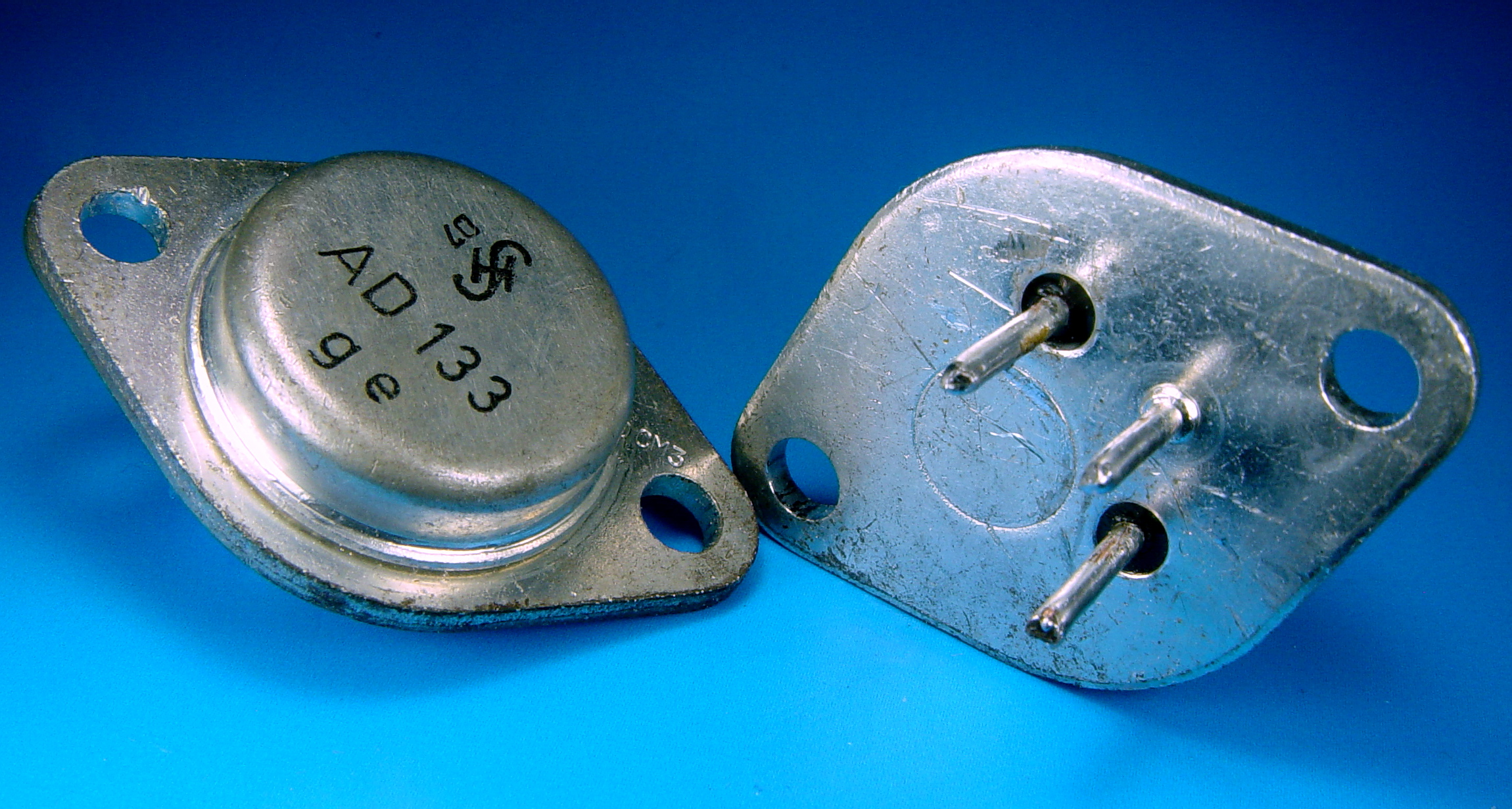
AD133 transistor in an IEC C14B/B28 package, similar to TO-41 but with a third pin connected to the case (here the soldering pads have been cut off)

The two pins of the TO-41 package end in soldering pads with holes in them to make it easier to solder wires to the pins for point-to-point construction (as opposed to soldering a TO-3 package on a printed circuit board). Otherwise the TO-41 package has the same dimensions as the TO-3 package. Some variants of the TO-41 package have a third pin with a soldering pad connected to the case (e.g. AD133, AUY21). This 3-pin package was standardized by IEC as C14B/B28.

=== TO-204 ===
TO-204 is intended to replace previous definitions of flange-mounted packages with a 10.92 mm (0.430 in) pin spacing. The different outlines are now defined as variants of TO-204: TO-3 is renamed to TO-204-AA, TO-41 to TO-204-AB. A new package with a reduced maximum height of 7.62 mm (0.300 in) is added as TO-204-AC. Two additional variants specify pins thicker than the original 1.02 mm (0.040 in) to allow higher currents: 1.27 mm (0.050 in) for TO-204-AD and 1.52 mm (0.060 in) for TO-204-AE.

== National standards ==
Standards organization	Standard	Designation for			
Standards organization	Standard	TO-3	TO-41	–	–
JEDEC	JEP95	TO-204-AA	TO-204-AB	TO-204-AC	TO-204-AD
IEC	IEC 60191 (Note: These standards have separate drawings for the package case and the base.)	C14A/B18	C14A/B20	C14B/B18	
DIN	DIN 41872	3A2		3B2 (Note: The maximum height is 8.63 mm (0.340 in).)	
EIAJ / JEITA	ED-7500A	TC-3/TB-3	–	TC-3A/TB-3	–
British Standards	BS 3934	SO-5A/SB2-2	–	SO-5B/SB2-2	
Gosstandart	GOST 18472—88	KT-9 (Note: Russian: КТ-9)	–	–	KT-9B
Rosstandart	GOST R 57439	KT-9	–	KT-9C	KT-9B
Kombinat Mikroelektronik Erfurt	TGL 11811	Eeb	–	Eea	–
Kombinat Mikroelektronik Erfurt	TGL 26713/11	L2A2	–	L2A1	–

== Common components in a TO-3 package ==
Common voltage regulator integrated circuits:

- LM317, voltage regulator
- LM78xx, voltage regulator
- LM340, voltage regulator

Common transistors:

- 2N3055, NPN power transistor
- MJ2955, PNP power transistor (not to be confused with a 2N2955 which is a small signal PNP transistor)
- KD503, NPN power transistor

== See also ==
- TO-66, smaller package of similar shape
- TO-220 plastic case used for power semiconductors with similar ratings to TO-3 cases
