= TO-92 =

Small and cheap semiconductor package often used for transistors

TO-92 front view

TO-92 back view

The TO-92 is a widely used style of semiconductor package mainly used for transistors. The case is often made of epoxy or plastic, and offers compact size at a very low cost.

== History and origin ==
The JEDEC TO-92 descriptor is derived from the original full name for the package: Transistor Outline Package, Case Style 92. The package is also known by the designation SOT54. By 1966 the package was being used by Motorola for their 2N3904 devices among others.

== Construction and orientation ==
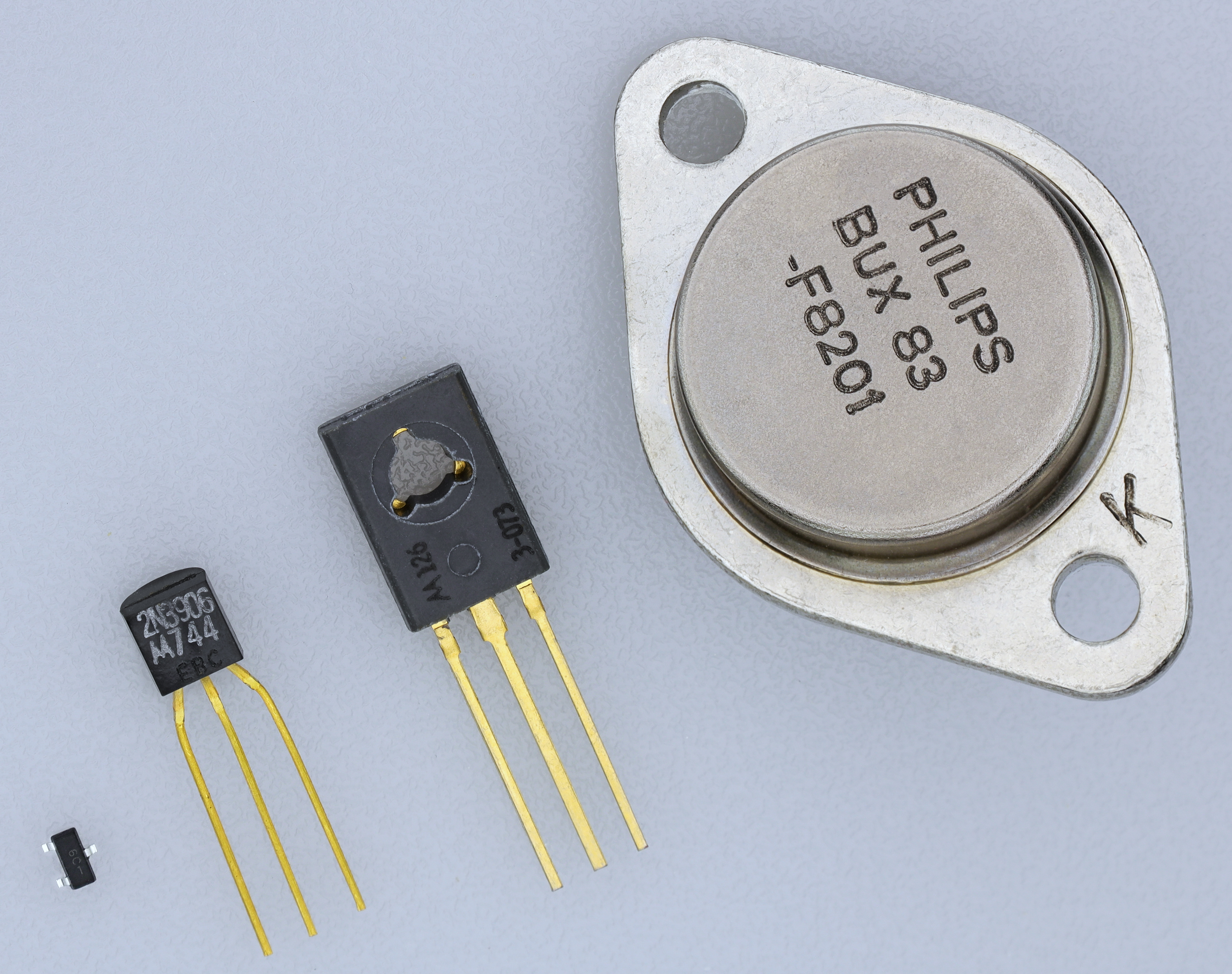
Size comparison of BJT transistor packages, from left to right: SOT-23, TO-92, TO-126, TO-3

The case is molded around the transistor elements in two parts; the face is flat, usually bearing a machine-printed part number (some early examples had the part number printed on the top surface instead). The back is semi-circularly-shaped. A line of moulding flash from the injection-moulding process can be seen around the case.

The leads protrude from the bottom of the case. When looking at the face of the transistor, the leads are commonly configured from left-to-right as the emitter, base, and collector for 2N series (JEDEC) transistors, however, other configurations are possible, such as emitter, collector, and base commonly used for 2S series (Japanese) transistors or collector, base, and emitter for many of the BC series (Pro Electron) types.

If the face has a part name made up of only one letter and a few numbers, it can be either a Japanese or a Pro Electron part number. Thus, "C1234" would likely be a 2SC1234 device, but "C547" is usually short for "BC547".

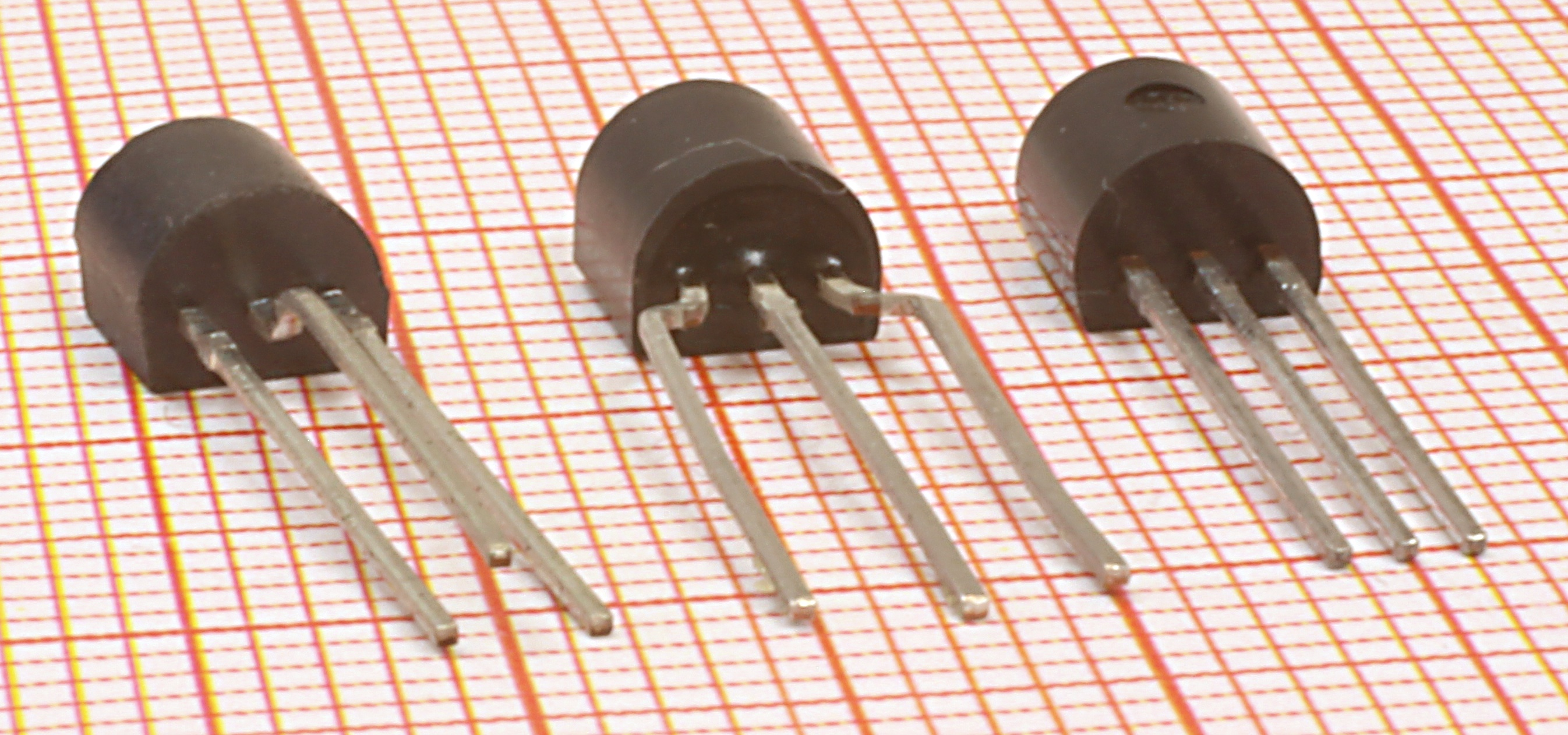
TO-92 packages with pre-bent wires; on the left to emulate a TO-18 footprint (SO-97 in BS 3934, 10A3 in DIN 41868)

The leads coming out of the case are spaced 0.05" (1.27 mm) apart. It is often convenient to bend them outward to a 0.10" (2.54 mm) spacing to make more room for wiring. Units with their leads pre-bent may be ordered to fit specific board layouts, depending on the application. Otherwise, the leads may be bent manually; however, care must be taken as they can break easily, as with any other device that is manually configured.

The physical dimensions of the TO-92 housing may vary slightly depending on the manufacturer, however, the 1.27mm lead spacing must be respected.

== Advantages ==
- Transistors of this type can be made very inexpensively and take up very little board space. Most models are readily available in large quantities from wholesale distributors.
- They are easy to find in small electronics stores because of their wide usefulness, making them a popular choice for hobby work and prototyping.

== Disadvantages ==
The main disadvantage of this style of case is the lack of heat sinking.

- Transistors and ICs of these types cannot handle as much power as higher-power equivalents, such as the TO-220, and can burn out quickly if they dissipate excessive power.
- There is no standard pinout for the TO-92. The American BJTs use the E-B-C pinout while their Japanese counterparts use the E-C-B pinout and some RF devices use the B-E-C pinout.

== Voltage and current ==
Although TO-92 devices are mainly used in low-voltage / low-current (<30 V; <1 A) applications, high-voltage (600 Volt Vce) and high-current (5 A Ic) devices are available. Nominal maximum power dissipation is less than one watt (600 mW).

== Variants ==
For diodes or integrated circuits with two connections (e.g. temperature sensors) the middle lead is either not connected or omitted entirely.

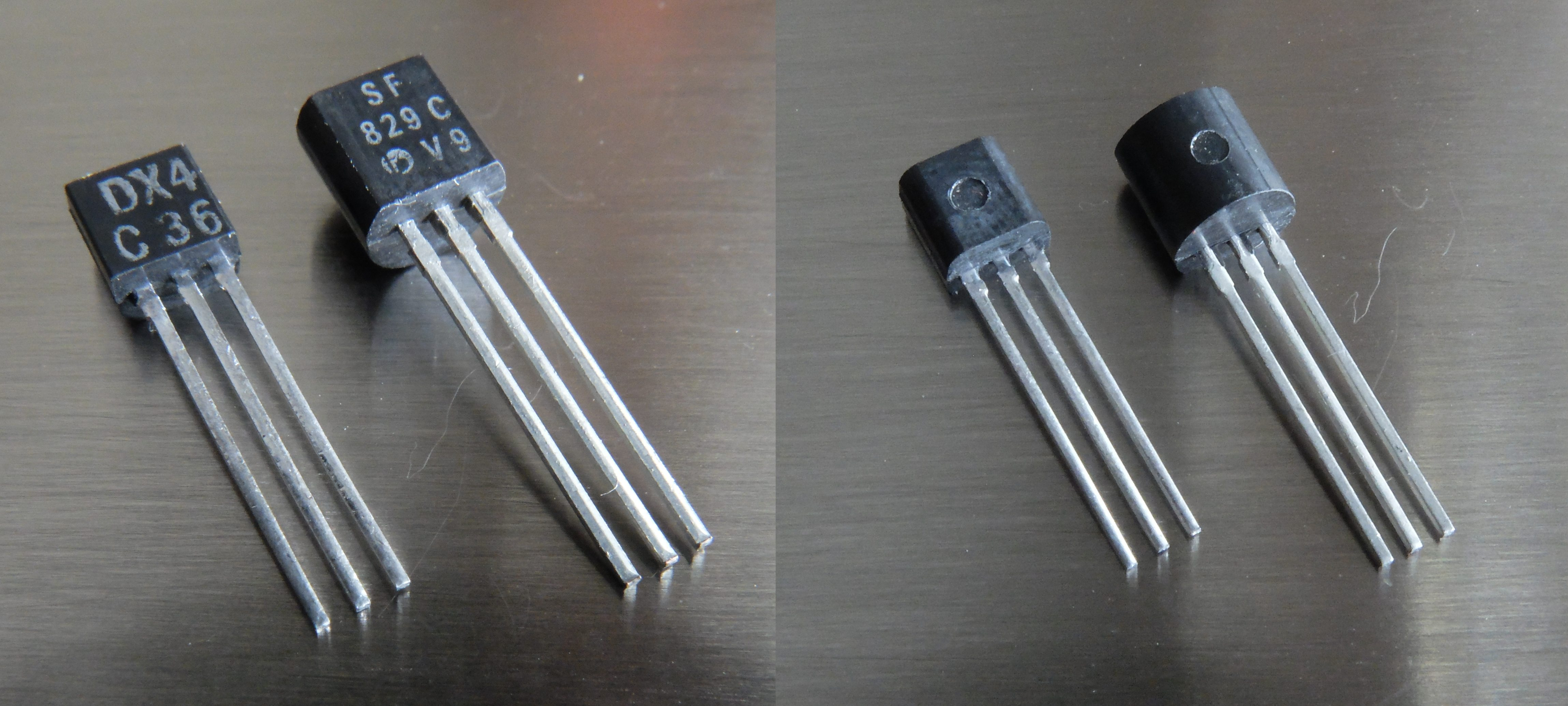
Comparison between the E-Line/Miniplast package and the TO-92 package

In the late 1960s, Ferranti introduced a smaller package with a compatible footprint, called "E-Line". This package was later standardized as a British Standard (but not by JEDEC) and remained in production with Ferranti Semiconductors' successor companies (Plessey, Zetex Semiconductors, Diodes Incorporated). In East Germany the E-Line package was known as the "Miniplast" package and widely used by Kombinat Mikroelektronik Erfurt.

== Standards ==
Standards organization	Standard	Designation for		
Standards organization	Standard	TO-92	E-Line/Miniplast	
Standards organization	Standard	TO-92	3-lead	2-lead
IEC	IEC 60191	A68		
DIN	DIN 41868	10B3 (Note: DIN 41868 also defines variants with the leads bent to emulate the footprint of other packages: 10A3 (TO-18 footprint).)		
EIAJ / JEITA	ED-7500A	SC-43A		
British Standards	BS 3934		SO-94 (Note: BS-3934 also defines variants with the leads bent to emulate the footprint of other packages: SO-95 (TO-5 footprint), SO-96 (for flat mounting), and SO-97 (TO-18 footprint).)	
Gosstandart	GOST 18472—88	KT-26 (Note: Russian: КТ-26)	—	KD-129 (Note: Russian: КД-129)
Rosstandart	GOST R 57439—2017	KT-26	—	KD-129
Kombinat Mikroelektronik Erfurt	TGL 200-8380	—	—	L2
Kombinat Mikroelektronik Erfurt	TGL 11811	—	L3	—
Kombinat Mikroelektronik Erfurt	TGL 26713/07	F2	F3	F4

== Common components in a TO-92 package ==
Common transistors:

- BC548, general purpose NPN transistor
- BC558, general purpose PNP transistor
- 2N3904, general purpose NPN transistor
- 2N3906, general purpose PNP transistor
- 2N7000, N-channel FET
- PN2222A, a "plastic" version of the original 2N2222 NPN transistor which came in a TO-18 package

Other common components:

- MK484, AM radio integrated circuit
- 78Lxx series, voltage regulator integrated circuits
- TL431, voltage regulator integrated circuit
