= Gosstandart =

Soviet government agency

- Russian: Госстандарт (Государственный стандарт)
- Romanization: Gosstandart (Gosudarstvenniy standart)
- Literal meaning: State standard

Gosstandart (Russian: Госстандарт) was the Soviet government agency responsible for standardization, metrology, and quality management. The name is an abbreviation for Gosudarstvennyy standart (‘State Standard’).

== History ==
Established in 1925, as a committee for standardization within the USSR Council of Labor and Defence, Gosstandart was at first put in charge of inspecting measuring instruments used in industrial and agricultural production and later was tasked with developing, updating, and disseminating GOST standards.

Over the course of its existence, the agency was reformed a number of times, receiving a new name with each transformation: the National Committee for Standardization; the Committee for Standards, Metrology, and Measuring Instruments; the State Committee for Standards; the State Committee for Standards and Product Quality Management. The agency received its nickname, Gosstandart, in 1970.

== Later years ==
After the dissolution of the USSR, the Russian government merged Gosstandart with Gosstandart Rossii. The current iteration of the agency in Russia is Rosstandart. In Ukraine, Gosstandart became Derzhstandart, an abbreviation for Derzhavnyy standart.

== Heads ==
- 1925–1927 Valerian Kuibyshev (Chairman of the Committee for Standardization under the Council of Labor and Defense)
- 1927 Gleb Krzhizhanovsky (Chairman of the Council for Standardization under the Council of Labor and Defense)
- 1928–1932 Friedrich Lengnik (Chairman of the All-Union Committee for Standardization under the Council of Labor and Defense)
- 1932–1936 Aleksei Gastev (Chairman of the All-Union Committee for Standardization under the Council of Labor and Defense)
- 1940–1942 Pavel Zernov (Chairman of the All-Union Committee for Standardization under the Council of People's Commissars of the USSR)
- 1943–1946 Vasily Emelyanov (Chairman of the All-Union Committee for Standardization under the Council of People's Commissars of the USSR)
- 1954–1963 Andrey Vyatkin (Chairman of the Committee of Standards, Measures and Measuring Instruments under the Council of Ministers of the USSR)
- 1963–1984 Vasily Boytsov (Chairman of the USSR State Committee for Standards)
- 1984–1989 Georgy Kolmogorov (Chairman of the USSR State Committee for Standards)
- 1989–1992 Valery Sychev (Chairman of the USSR State Committee for Product Quality Management and Standardization, and then of the Committee for Standardization and Metrology under the USSR Cabinet of Ministers)

== See also ==
- State Acceptance of Production
