= Rosstandart =

Standards body of Russia

Federal Agency for Technical Regulation and Metrology
- Федеральное агентство по техническому регулированию и метрологии
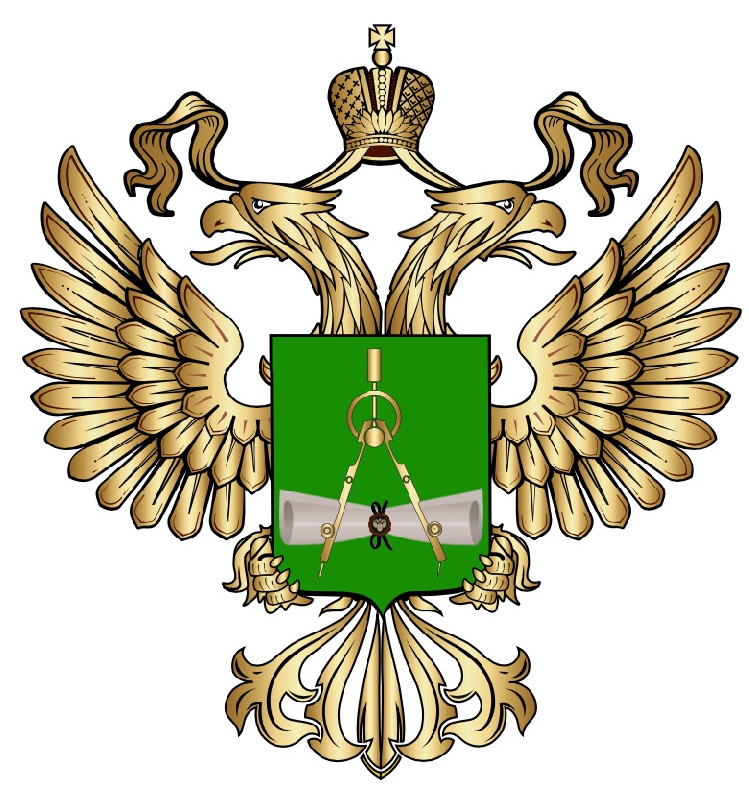
- Official emblem

Agency overview
- Formed: 2004
- Jurisdiction: Government of Russia
- Headquarters: in Moscow at Presnenskaya Naberezhnaya 10, Building 2 (IQ-block)
- Agency executive: Alexei Abramov
- Parent agency: Ministry of Industry and Trade
- Website: rst.gov.ru

Federal Agency for Technical Regulation and Metrology (Rosstandart) (Russian: Федеральное агентство по техническому регулированию и метрологии (Росстандарт)) is the Russian federal government agency that serves as a national standardization body of the Russian Federation. It was previously known as Gosstandart. It is subordinated to the Ministry of Industry and Trade.

== History ==
On September 15, 1925, by a resolution of the Council of People's Commissars of the USSR, an all-Union body in the field of standardization was created, the Committee for Standardization under the Council of Labor and Defense (Gosstandart). The introduction of state management of standardization in the country served as the beginning of systematic work in all sectors of the economy. On May 7, 1926, the first all-Union standard was approved - OST 1 “Wheat. Breeding grades of grain. Nomenclature".

In 1946, the International Organization for Standardization (ISO) was established. The USSR took over the work of the secretariats of technical committees: 37 “Terminology (general principles and coordination)”, 55 “Timber (lumber assortment and coordination)”, 57 “Clean surfaces (metals)” and 65 “Manganese ores (chemical analysis methods)” .

In 1954, a State Committee for standards, measures and measuring instruments (Gosstandart) was formed under the Council of Ministers of the USSR on the basis of the merger of the standardization department under the State Planning Committee of the USSR and the main chamber of measures and measuring instruments of the USSR Ministry of Finance.

In the 1960s and 1980s, work was carried out to streamline and regulate all work in the field of standardization itself. In 1968, a set of standards GOST 1 "State Standardization System" was introduced.

On May 22, 1991, the USSR Law "On the Protection of Consumer Rights" adopted by the Supreme Council of the USSR introduced mandatory certification of certain products (goods, works and services).

== Mission ==
In 2004, Gosstandart of Russia was folded into the Ministry of Industry and Energy and became known as the Federal Agency for Technical Regulation and Metrology, or Rostekhregulirovaniye (Ростехрегулирование). From June 2010 the short name became Rosstandart (Росстандарт). The new name reflects a new role the agency is supposed to play in the Russian government's effort to reduce barriers to trade and get the Russian economy more closely aligned with the global marketplace. Rosstandart continues its sponsorship and funding of the development of GOST R standards, the national standards of the Russian Federation.

== Responsibilities ==
Rosstandart carries out powers in the established field of activity, including:

- performs the functions of the competent administrative body of the Russian Federation in accordance with the agreement on the adoption of uniform technical requirements for wheeled vehicles, equipment and parts that can be installed and / or used on wheeled vehicles, and on the conditions for mutual recognition of approvals issued based on these regulations, concluded in Geneva on March 20, 1958;
- organizes the examination of draft national standards;
- performs a number of functions in the field of control and supervision activities (in particular, on the compliance of products with the certain technical regulations requirements; federal metrological supervision, etc.)
- manages the activities of the state metrological service, the state service of time, frequency and determination of the parameters of the Earth's rotation, the state service of standard reference data on physical constants and properties of substances and materials, the state service of standard samples on the composition and properties of substances and materials, as well as approval of national standards;
- leads the federal information fund of technical regulations and standards.

Among other responsibilities of the agency are representing the Russian Federation to international and regional standards organizations (such as the ISO, IEC, and EASC) and administering the GOST R certification program for products.

== See also ==
- GOST R standards
- GOST standards
- List of technical standard organizations
