= JIS semiconductor designation =

Japanese Industrial Standards (JIS) has standard JIS-C-7012 for semiconductor part numbers. The first digit denotes the p-n junction count ("3" may also denote a dual-gate FET); then follows the letter "S", then:

2nd letter	Type of semiconductor
<none>	Diode
A	high frequency PNP BJTs
B	audio frequency PNP BJTs
C	high frequency NPN BJTs
D	audio frequency NPN BJTs
E	Diode
F	Thyristor
G	Gunn diode
H	UJT
J	P-channel FETs (both JFETs and MOSFETs)
K	N-channel FETs (both JFETs and MOSFETs)
M	TRIAC
Q	LED
R	Rectifier
S	Signal diode
T	Avalanche diode
V	Varicap
Z	Zener Diode

Then follows the Japan Electronics and Information Technology Industries Association's Electronic DEvice REgistration Center (JEITA-EDEREC)-assigned part number, optionally followed by suffixes (such as "A", "B", "C", or "R", "O", "BL", standing for "Red", "Orange", "Blue" etc.) to denote variants, such as tighter h_{FE} (gain) groupings.

Example: 2SD965, but sometimes the "2S" prefix is not marked on the package – a 2SD965 might only be marked "D965"; a 2SC1815 might be listed by a supplier as simply "C1815", thus possibly creating confusion with Pro Electron abbreviated markings, because a transistor marked "D965" might either be a 2SD965 or a BD965.

== See also ==
- JEDEC
- Pro Electron
- Mullard–Philips tube designation
- RMA tube designation
- RETMA tube designation
- Russian tube designations
