= Tube designation =

Systems for naming or numbering vacuum tubes include:

- Mullard–Philips tube designation
- RMA tube designation
- RETMA tube designation
- Russian tube designations
