= Pro Electron =

Logo of the European Electronic Component Manufacturers Association (EECA)

Pro Electron or EECA is the European type designation and registration system for active devices, such as semiconductors, liquid crystal displays, sensor devices, electronic tubes and cathode-ray tubes.

Pro Electron was set up in 1966 in Brussels, Belgium. In 1983 it was merged with the European Electronic Component Manufacturers Association (EECA) and since then operates as an agency of the EECA.

The goal of Pro Electron is to allow unambiguous identification of electronic parts, even when made by several different manufacturers. To this end, manufacturers register new devices with the agency and receive new type designators for them.

== Designation system ==
Examples of Pro Electron type designators are:

- AD162 – Germanium power transistor for audio frequency use
- BY133 – Silicon rectifier
- BZY88C5V1 – Silicon 5.1 volt Zener diode
- CQY97 – light emitting diode
- ECC83 – 6.3 volt heater noval dual triode
- A63EAA00XX01 – Color TV picture tube
- SAA1300 – Digital integrated circuit

Pro Electron took the popular European coding system in use from around 1934 for valves (tubes), i.e. the Mullard–Philips tube designation, and essentially re-allocated several of the rarely used heater designations (first letter of the part number) for semiconductors. The second letter was used in a similar way to the valves naming convention: "A" for signal diode, "C" for low-power bipolar transistor or triode, "D" for high-power transistor (or triode), and "Y" for rectifier, but other letter designations did not follow the vacuum tube mode so closely.

The three digits (or letter followed by two digits) after the first two letters were essentially a sequence number, with (at first) a vestige of the valve-era convention that the first one or two digits would indicate the base (package) type in examples such as in this family of general-purpose transistors:

Package	NPN	PNP
TO-18	BC10x	BC17x
Lockfit	BC14x	BC15x
TO-92	BC54x	BC55x

... where x may be:

- 7 for high voltage
- 8 for general purpose
- 9 for low noise/high gain

Pro Electron naming for transistors and Zener diodes has been widely taken up by semiconductor manufactures around the world. Pro Electron naming of integrated circuits, other than some special (e.g. television signal-processing) chips, did not greatly take hold (even in Europe). Other popular designation systems were used for many integrated circuits.

=== Differences between Pro Electron and earlier valve-naming conventions ===
- Unlike the tube naming convention, if there are two transistors in a single envelope, the type letter was never repeated - so a dual NPN RF transistor might get a type "BFM505" rather than something like "BFF505" for instance.
- Although some of the most popular devices conform to a pattern of serial numbers that identified package type and polarity, many do not.
- The letters assigned for the second character of transistor and diode type numbers differ in several ways, e.g.
  - "B" tends to be used for dual varicap diodes
  - "L" in the context of transistors designates RF power (transmitting) transistors; for valves it meant a high-power pentode tube (the usual choice for power RF)
  - "Z" is used for semiconductor Zener diodes instead of (full-wave) rectifier valves (tubes).

=== Frequently used first letters in European active devices ===
  - A Germanium (or any semiconductor with junctions in a material with a band gap of 0.6 to 1.0eV)
  - B Silicon (or band gap of 1.0 to 1.3eV)
  - C III-V semiconductors with a band gap of 1.3eV or more, like gallium arsenide in LEDs
  - D may be...
    - Semiconductors with a band gap less than 0.6eV, such as indium antimonide in infrared detectors (rarely used), or
    - (Mullard–Philips) 1.4V (or less) filament tubes
  - E (Mullard–Philips) tubes with a 6.3V heater
  - F Digital integrated circuits
  - P (Mullard–Philips) tubes for a 300mA series heater supply
  - R Devices without junctions, e.g. cadmium sulfide in a photoresistor
  - S Solitary digital integrated circuits
  - T Linear integrated circuits
  - U may be...
    - (Mullard–Philips) tubes for a 100mA series heater supply, or
    - Mixed digital/analogue integrated circuits

== Electron tubes ==
- See Mullard–Philips tube designation for details. A brief summary of just the more common letters is:

    ECC81
   /  \ \\__ last digit(s)=serial number
  /    \ \__ first digit(s)=base (3=8pin 8,18,80=Noval (B9A), 9=Mini 7-pin (B7G)
 /      \___ one letter per valve unit in the tube:
D=1.4v or less      A=single-diode (low power)
E=6.3v*             B=double-diode (usually shared cathode, but not always)
P=300mA             C=triode
U=100mA             F=pentode (low power)
                    L=pentode (high power)
                    Y=Single-phase rectifier
                    Z=Full-wave rectifier
* Note: some 6.3 volt heater types have a split heater allowing series (12.6 volt; the
  default for Noval pins 4 to 5) or parallel (6.3 volt) operation.

== Semiconductor diodes and transistors ==
=== The first letter gives the semiconductor type ===
(see above)

=== The second letter denotes the intended use ===
2nd letter	Usage	Example
A	Low-power/small-signal diode	AA119, BA121
B	Varicap diode	BB105G
C	Small signal transistor, R_{thJC} > 15K/W	BC546C
D	High-power, low-frequency power transistor, R_{thJC} ≤ 15K/W	BD139
E	Tunnel (Esaki-)diode	AE100
F	Low-power, RF (high-frequency) bipolar or FET, R_{thJC} > 15K/W	BF245
G	Hybrid device	BGY32, BGY585
H	Hall-effect sensor/diode	
L	High-frequency, high-power transistor (for transmitters), R_{thJC} ≤ 15K/W	BLW34
M	Ring modulator-type frequency mixer	
N	Opto-isolator	CNY17
P	Radiation detector (photodiode, phototransistor)	BPW34
Q	Radiation generator (LED)	CQY99
R	Low-power control or switching device: thyristors, diacs, triacs, UJTs, programmable unijunction transistors (PUT), silicon bidirectional switch (SBS), opto-triacs etc.	BR100
S	Low-power switching transistor, bipolar or MOSFET, R_{thJC} > 15K/W	BS170
T	High-power control or switching device: thyristors, TRIACs, silicon bidirectional switch (SBS), etc.	BT138
U	High-power switching transistors, bipolar or MOSFET, R_{thJC} ≤ 15K/W	BU508, BUZ11
V	Antenna	
W	Surface-acoustic-wave device	
X	Frequency multiplier: varactor, step recovery diode	
Y	High-power rectifying diode	BY228
Z	Avalanche, TVS, Zener diode	BZY91

=== The serial number ===
Following these two letters is a 3- or 4-digit serial number (or another letter then digits), assigned by Pro Electron. It is not always merely a sequence number; there is sometimes information conveyed in the number:

- In early devices only, the serial number often indicated the case/package type (e.g. AF114-7 for TO-5 case, while AF124-7 were TO-72 versions of the same transistors); modern surface-mount devices often begin with "8",
- early silicon transistors followed the convention of using a middle digit of 0-5 for NPN and 6-9 for PNP.
- the last digit often indicated a particular specification or application grouping, e.g. the AF117 and AF127 were similar IF amplifier devices in different cases; the BC109, BC149, BC169 and BC549 are similar low-noise transistors).
- some modern devices use letters, such as "B" to indicate HBT bipolar transistors.

=== Suffixes and version specifiers ===
Suffixes may be used, letters or perhaps blocks of digits delimited by "/" or "-" from the serial number, often without fixed meanings but some of the more common conventions are:

- for small-signal transistors "A" to "C" often means low to high h_{FE}, such as in: BC549C),
- numeric suffixes may be used as an alternative way to show h_{FE} (e.g. BC327-25), or voltage rating (e.g. BUK854-800A).
- for voltage reference diodes letters show the tolerance ("A","B","C","D","E" indicate 1%/2%/5%/10*/20%) and may be followed by the V_{z} value, e.g. 6V8 for 6.8 Volts or 18V for 18 volts.
- "R" can mean "reverse polarity".

Examples of suffixes and manufacturers' extensions to the basic sequence number include:

Prefix class	Usage	Example	Notes
AC	Germanium small signal transistor	AC127/01	an AC127 (TO-1 case) with built-on heat-conducting block
AF	Germanium RF transistor	AFY40R	the "Y40" sequence number implies industrial uses, the "R" indicates reduced specifications
BC	Silicon, small-signal transistor ("allround" or "G.P.")	BC183LB	the "L" indicates Base-Collector-Emitter pinout while the "B" suffix indicates medium gain (240-500 h_{FE}) selection
BC	Silicon, small-signal transistor	BC337-25	-25 indicates an h_{FE} of around 250 (140-400 range)
BD	Silicon Darlington-pair power transistor	BDT60B	the "B" suffix here indicates medium voltage (-100V_{CBO})
BF	Silicon RF (high-frequency) BJT or FET	BF493S	a BF493 with a -350V_{CEO} rating
BL	Silicon high-frequency, high-power (for transmitters)	BLY49A	BLY49 in a TO-66 case
BS	Silicon switching transistor, bipolar or MOSFET	BSV52LT1	SOT-23 (surface-mount) package
BT	Silicon Thyristor or TRIAC	BT138/800	800V-rated TRIAC
BU	Silicon high-voltage (for CRT horizontal deflection circuits)	BU508D	a BU508 with integral damper diode
BZ	Silicon regulator ("Zener") diode	BZY88-C5V6	"C" indicates 5% tolerance, "5V6" indicates 5.6V_{z}

Note: A BC546 might only be marked "C546" by some manufacturers, thus possibly creating confusion with JIS abbreviated markings, because a transistor marked "C546" might also be a 2SC546.

Short summary of the most common semiconductor diode and transistor designations:

      BC549C
     / |--- \___ variant (A, B, C for transistors implies low, medium or high gain)
    /  |   \____ serial number (at least 3 digits or letter and 2 digits)
   /  device type:
A=Ge     A=Signal diode
B=Si     C=LF low-power transistor
         D=LF Power transistor
         F=RF transistor (or FET) 
         P=Photosensitive transistor etc.
         T=Triac or thyristor
         Y=Rectifier diode
         Z=Zener diode

=== Usage in the Eastern Bloc ===
Poland, Hungary, Romania, and Cuba mostly used Pro Electron designations for discrete semiconductors just like Western Europe. Starting in 1971, in Poland the letter "P" was inserted, e.g. BUY54 became BUYP54. Kombinat Mikroelektronik Erfurt (KME) in East Germany and Tesla (Czechoslovak company) used designations derived from the Pro Electron scheme. In particular, the first letter specifying the material differed while the second letter followed the table above (with the few exceptions for KME noted below).

Material	1st letter Pro Electron	1st letter KME East Germany	1st letter Tesla
Germanium	A	G	G
Silicon	B	S	K
Compound materials (GaAs etc.)	C	V	L
Multiple materials (e.g. Si + GaAs)	C	M	—

2nd letter	KME East Germany usage
B	Optoisolator (varicaps were included with other diodes under letter A)
M	MOSFET (Pro Electron includes MOSFETs in letters C, D, F, L, S, U)
W	Sensors other than radiation detectors

Examples: GD241C - Germanium power transistor from KME; MB111 - optoisolator from KME; KD503 - Silicon power transistor from Tesla; LQ100 - LED from Tesla.

== Integrated circuits ==
The integrated circuit designation consists of three letters, followed by a serial number of three to five digits. Initially, only three-digit serial numbers were allowed. For designations with a three-digit serial number the third initial letter had a defined meaning for digital integrated circuits (see below) and the operating temperature range was encoded in the last digit of the serial number. The specification was changed in 1973 to allow longer serial numbers. For designations with a serial number of more than three digits the third initial letter encodes the temperature range. Optionally, a version letter (A, B, ...) and / or a package designation can follow after the serial number.

1st letter	Usage	Example
F, G, H, I	Digital integrated circuit that is part of a family	FLH101
M	Microprocessor	MAB2650A
N	Charge-transfer devices and switched capacitors	
P	Digital integrated circuit that is part of a family	PMB2205
S	Digital integrated circuit that is not part of a family ("solitary")	SAA1099
T	Analogue integrated circuit	TEA1002
U	Mixed-signal integrated circuit (analogue and digital)	UAA180

Operating temperature ranges
Range	3-digit serial number)		serial number with more than 3 digits	
Range	3rd digit	Example	3rd letter	Example
No temperature range specified	0	TCA220	A	TDA5140A
0 °C to +70 °C	1	FLH241	B	PSB2115F
−55 °C to +125 °C	2	TAA762	C	HCC4012B
−10 °C to +85 °C	3		—	—
+15 °C to +55 °C	4		—	—
−25 °C to +70 °C	5	FLH185	D	SAD1009P
−25 °C to +85 °C	—	—	E	TBE2335
−40 °C to +85 °C	6	FJH106	F	HEF4011BP

Common package designations
Package	Description	Example
E	Ball grid array (BGA)	PMB2800E
H	Quad Flat Package (QFP)	SAA7146AH
N	Quad Flat Package (QFP) non leaded	PEB2086N
P	Plastic dual in-line package (DIP)	PCF8574P
T	Small Outline Package (SOP)	PCF8574AT

=== Digital logic families ===
The combination of first letter and second letter is assigned to a specific manufacturer.

   FCH171
  //  \ \__ serial number (including temperature range)
 //    \___ H=gate ("Combinatorial circuit"), J=flip-flop, K=monostable, L=level shifter, Q=RAM, R=ROM, Y=miscellaneous etc.
FC=DTL by Philips[9] / Mullard[8]
FD=dynamic PMOS by Philips[9] / Mullard[8]
FE=PMOS by Philips[9] / Mullard[8]
FH=TTL by Philips[9] (SUHL II series)
FJ=TTL by Philips[9] / Mullard[8] (7400 series)
FK=E2CL by Philips[9]
FL=TTL by Siemens (7400 series)[10]
FN=ECL by Telefunken[11]
FP=HTL by Telefunken[11][12]
FQ=DTL by SGS-ATES[13][14]
FS=SECL by Telefunken[11]
FY=ECL by Siemens[10]
FZ=HTL by Siemens[10]
GD=PMOS by Siemens (MEM1000 series)[15]
GH=ECL by Philips[16]
GJ=TTL by Mullard (74H00 series)[8]
GR=interface devices by Mullard (7500 series)[8]
GT=TTL by Mullard (74S00 series)[8]

Unfortunately the serial number does not specify the same type of gate in each family, e.g. while an FJH131 is a quadruple 2-input NAND gate (like the 7400), an FCH131 is a dual 4-input NAND gate, and an FLH131 is an 8-input NAND gate (equivalent to 7430). To lessen the confusion at least for the 7400 series, at some point manufacturers included the well-known 7400 series designation both in their literature and on the integrated circuits themselves.

== See also ==
- JEDEC
- JIS semiconductor designation
- Mullard–Philips tube designation
- RMA tube designation
- RETMA tube designation
- Russian tube designations
- Soviet integrated circuit designation
- East German integrated circuit designation
