= EECA =

EECA may refer to:

- Energy Efficiency and Conservation Authority (New Zealand)
- European Electronic Component Manufacturers Association
- Eastern Europe and Central Asia
- Emerging Europe and Central Asia
