= Part number =

Identifier of a particular part design in engineering

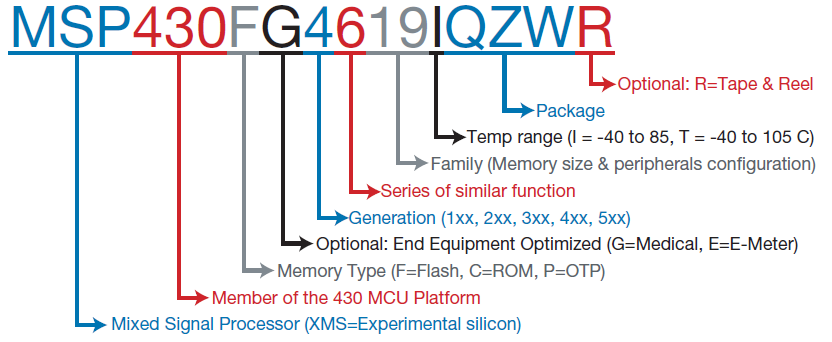
Example of a part number for a microcontroller

A part number (often abbreviated PN, P/N, part no., or part #) is an identifier of a particular part design or material used in a particular industry. Its purpose is to simplify reference that item. A part number unambiguously identifies a part design within a single corporation, sometimes across several corporations. For example, when specifying a screw, it is easier to refer to "HSC0424PP" than saying "Hardware, screw, machine, 4-40, 3/4" long, pan head, Phillips". In this example, "HSC0424PP" is the part number. It may be prefixed in database fields as "PN HSC0424PP" or "P/N HSC0424PP". The "Part Number" term is often used loosely to refer to items or components (assemblies or parts), and is equivalent to "Item Number", and overlaps with other terms like SKU (Stock Keeping Unit).

== The part design versus instantiations of it ==
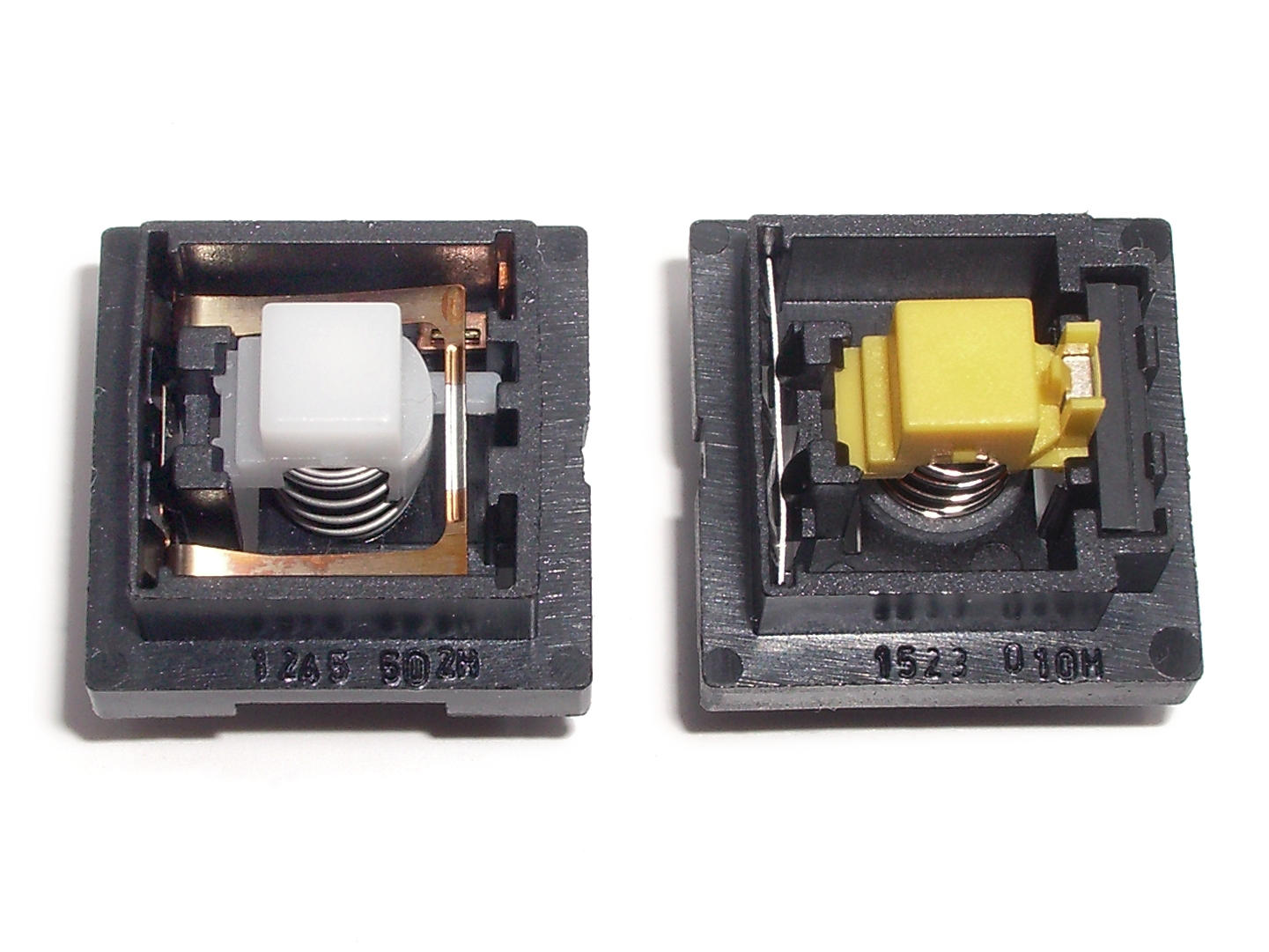
Parts marked with assigned part numbers

As a part number is an identifier of a part design (independent of its instantiations), a serial number is a unique identifier of a particular instantiation of that part design. In other words, a part number identifies any particular (physical) part as being made to that one unique design; a serial number, when used, identifies a particular (physical) part (one physical instance), as differentiated from the next unit that was stamped, machined, or extruded right after it. This distinction is not always clear, as natural language blurs it by typically referring to both part designs, and particular instantiations of those designs, by the same word, "part(s)". Thus if you buy a muffler of P/N 12345 today, and another muffler of P/N 12345 next Tuesday, you have bought "two copies of the same part", or "two parts", depending on the sense implied.

== User part numbers versus manufacturing part numbers (MPN) ==
A business using a part will often use a different part number than the various manufacturers of that part do. This is especially common for catalog hardware, because the same or similar part design (say, a screw with a certain standard thread, of a certain length) might be made by many corporations (as opposed to unique part designs, made by only one or a few).

For example, when referring to a "Hardware, screw, machine, 4-40, 3/4" long, Phillips":

- Manufacturer A uses part number "4-40-3/4"-pan-phil",
- Manufacturer B uses part number "100-440-0.750-3434-A".
- Manufacturer C uses part number "TSR-1002".

The business using such a screw may buy screws from any of those manufacturers, because each supplier manufactures the parts to the same specification. To identify such screws, the user doesn't want to use any of those manufacturer's part numbers, because

- it would imply that one manufacturer is acceptable and the other ones aren't, and,
- it wishes to use a consistent format for the part numbers of all of the parts it uses.

Therefore, the user devises its own part numbering system. In such a system, the user may use the part number "HSC0424PP" for that screw.

There are also some national and industry-association initiatives which help producers and consumers codify the product based on a unified scheme to establish a common language between industrial and commercial sectors. For example:

- The Iranian national classification and codification system known as Irancode is a 16 digit code to codify the products in a nationally unified manner.
- The U.S. government, and most especially its Department of Defense, has standardized various part numbering systems over the decades for it and its suppliers to use, such as the AN (Army-Navy) and MS (Military Standard) hardware classification and numbering systems.
- The Aerospace Industries Association maintains the NAS system (National Aerospace Standards), which is gradually replacing the AN and MS systems.
- The ASME provides a codification of fastener specifications in B18.24 Part Identifying Number (PIN) Code System Standard for B18 Fastener Products.

== Significant versus non-significant part numbers ==
In general, there are two types of part numbering systems: significant (a.k.a. "intelligent") and non-significant (a.k.a. "non-intelligent").

- In a significant part numbering system, the part numbers are assigned intelligently, according to an encoding system, and thus they give an indication of salient characteristics of the component. For example, a screw may have the part number "HSC0424PP"; in this case, the letters indicate characteristics of the component:
  - H = "Hardware"
  - S = "Machine Screw"
  - C0424 = "4-40, 3/4" long"
  - PP = "Panhead Phillips"
- In a non-significant part numbering system, part numbers are assigned in some other fashion, such as sequentially or arbitrarily. For example, a screw may have the part number "1002", which may not tell the user anything about its thread size, shank length, or drive type.

In a company, significant numbering systems help identify an item from its code rather than from a long description. However, variations can arise when codes are used by other companies, which may be your distributors, and can cause confusion.

Non-significant part numbers are easier to assign and manage. They can still have some structure, such as a numeric category followed by a sequential number. Eg: 231-1002 (2=Hardware 3=Screw 1=Phillips, 1002 = sequential number). This enables more efficient data entry, using a keypad, which normally includes digits and dashes, and is operated one-handed, leaving the other hand free. Other benefits: people find numbers easier; in a warehouse, one can store products in numeric order (for example, in an aisle, numbers can increase from one end to the other).

== Dash numbers ==
There is a strong tradition in part numbering practice, in use across many corporations, to use suffixes consisting of a "dash" followed by a number comprising 1 or 2 digits (occasionally more). These suffixes are called dash numbers, and they are a common way of logically associating a set of detail parts or subassemblies that belong to a common assembly or part family. For example, the part numbers 12345-1, 12345-2, and 12345-3 are three different dash numbers of the same part family.

In precise typographical and character encoding terms, it is actually a hyphen, not a dash, that is usually used; but the word "dash" is firmly established in the spoken and written usage of the engineering and manufacturing professions; "dash number", not "hyphen number", is the standard term. This comes from the era before computers, when most typographical laypeople did not need to differentiate the characters or glyphs precisely.

Some companies follow a convention of circling the dash numbers on a drawing, such as in view designators and subpart callouts.

== Relationship of part numbers to drawing numbers ==
Another widespread tradition is using the drawing number as the root (or stem) of the part number; in this tradition, the various dash-number parts usually appear as views on the self-same drawing. For example, drawing number 12345 may show an assembly, P/N 12345-1, which comprises detail parts -2 ("dash two"), -3, -4, -8, and -11. Even drawings for which there is currently only one part definition existing will often designate that part with a part number comprising drawing number plus -1 ("dash one"). This is to provide extensibility of the part numbering system, in anticipation of a day when it might be desired to add another part definition to the family, which can then become -2 ("dash two"), followed by -3 ("dash three"), and so on.

Some corporations make no attempt to encode part numbers and drawing numbers with common encoding; they are paired arbitrarily. In other numbering schemes there is no separate drawing number, the drawing simply reuses the part number.

== Parametric families of parts, and tabulations of part numbers with parameter values ==
Often more than one version of a part design will be specified on one drawing. This allows for easy updating of one drawing that covers a family of parts, and it keeps the specifications for similar parts on one drawing. For example:

M6 Machine screw, Philips Head
Dash number	Length	Thread size	Drive style
-01	10 mm	M6	Philips
-02	15 mm	M6	Philips
-03	20 mm	M6	Philips

A common application of tabulation of part families is multiple dimensions within a general design, e.g. bushing:

Bushing, 10mm
Dash number	Length	Outer diameter	Inner diameter
-01	10 mm	10 mm	8 mm
-02	10 mm	12 mm	8 mm
-03	10 mm	12 mm	10 mm

== Design modification suffixes ==
It is a common concept in many corporations to add certain suffixes beyond, or in place of, the regular dash numbers, in order to designate a part that is mostly in conformance with the part design (that is, mostly "to print"), but intentionally lacks certain features. The suffixes are usually "intelligent", that is, they use an encoding system, although the encoding systems are usually corporation-specific (and thus cryptic, and of little use, to outsiders).

An example of such a design modification suffix is adding "V" or "Z" to the end of the part number to designate the variant of the part that is purchased "less paint", "less plating", "with the holes not yet drilled", "intentionally oversize by 0.01 mm (0.00039 in)", or any of countless other modifications. The intent is usually that the feature in question (such as holes not yet drilled, or paint not yet sprayed) will be added at a higher assembly level; or that maintenance workers in the field will choose from a kit of undersize and oversize parts (such as bushings) in order to achieve a certain fit (sliding fit, light press fit, etc.).

Sometimes the terms "engineering part number" and "manufacturing part number" are used to differentiate the "normal" or "basic" part number (engineering PN) from the modification-suffixed part number (manufacturing PN).

== Symmetrical parts ==
Many assemblies with reflection symmetry, such as the fuselages and wings of aircraft, the hulls of ships and boats, and the bodies of cars and trucks, require matched pairs of parts that are identical, or nearly identical, except for being mirror images of each other. (For example, the left and right wings of an airplane, or the left and right fenders or doors of a car.) Often these related parts are designated left-hand (LH) and right-hand (RH) parts. It is a common practice to give them sequential dash numbers, or -LH and -RH part number suffixes. It is also not uncommon to show only one of them on the drawing, and to define the symmetrical counterpart simply by stating that it is "opposite". Common notations include "left-hand shown, right-hand opposite" or "-1, LH (shown); -2, RH (opposite)".

== Phantom parts ==
The term phantom part is sometimes used to describe a series of parts that collectively make up an assembly or subassembly. This concept is helpful in the database management of engineering and production (such as in product data management applications) when it is useful to think of a certain combination of subparts as "one part" (and thus one database record) for ordering, production, or billing purposes.

== Synthetic parts ==
It is common in the engineering of parts, subassemblies, and higher assemblies to treat the definition of a certain part as a very well-defined concept, with every last detail controlled by the engineering drawing or its accompanying technical product documentation (TPD). This is necessary because of the separation of concerns that often exists in production, in which the maker of each part (whether an in-house department or a vendor) does not have all the information needed to decide whether any particular small variation is acceptable or not (that is, "whether the part will still work" or "whether it will still fit into the assembly" interchangeably). The sizes of fillets and edge breaks are common examples of such details where production staff must say, "it may easily be trivial, but it could possibly matter, and we're not the ones who can tell which is true in this case".

However, a challenge to this paradigm (of perfectly frozen part definition) is that sometimes it is necessary to obtain a part that is "mostly like" part A but that also incorporates some of the features of parts B and C. For example, a new variant of model of next-higher assembly may require this. Although this "blending" of part designs could happen very informally in a non-mass-production environment (such as an engineering lab, home business, or prototyping toolroom), it requires more forethought when the concerns are more thoroughly separated (such as when some production is outsourced to vendors). In the latter case, a new part definition, termed a synthetic part (because its definition synthesizes features from various other parts), is created. Ideally it is then formally defined with a new drawing; but often in the imperfect reality of the business world, to save time and expense, an improvised TPD will be prepared for it consisting of several existing drawings and some notes about which features to synthesize.

== Machine-readable part marking ==
It is common today for part numbers (as well as serial numbers or other information) to be marked on the part in ways that facilitate machine-readability, such as barcodes or QR codes. Today's advanced state of optical character recognition (OCR) technology also means that machines can often read the human-readable format of Arabic numerals and Latin script. Current revisions of major part marking standards (such as the U.S. military's MIL-STD-130) take pains to codify the most advantageous combinations of machine-readable information (MRI) and human-readable information (HRI).

== See also ==
- Builder's plate
- Manufacturer model number
- Global Trade Item Number (GTIN)
- Pro Electron (European designation and registration system for electronic parts)
- RETMA tube designation
- Stock Keeping Unit (SKU)
- Serial code
