= 2N3055 =

Early power transistor

The 2N3055 is a silicon NPN power transistor intended for general purpose applications. It was introduced in the early 1960s by RCA using a hometaxial power transistor process, transitioned to an epitaxial base in the mid-1970s. Its numbering follows the JEDEC standard. It is a transistor type of enduring popularity.

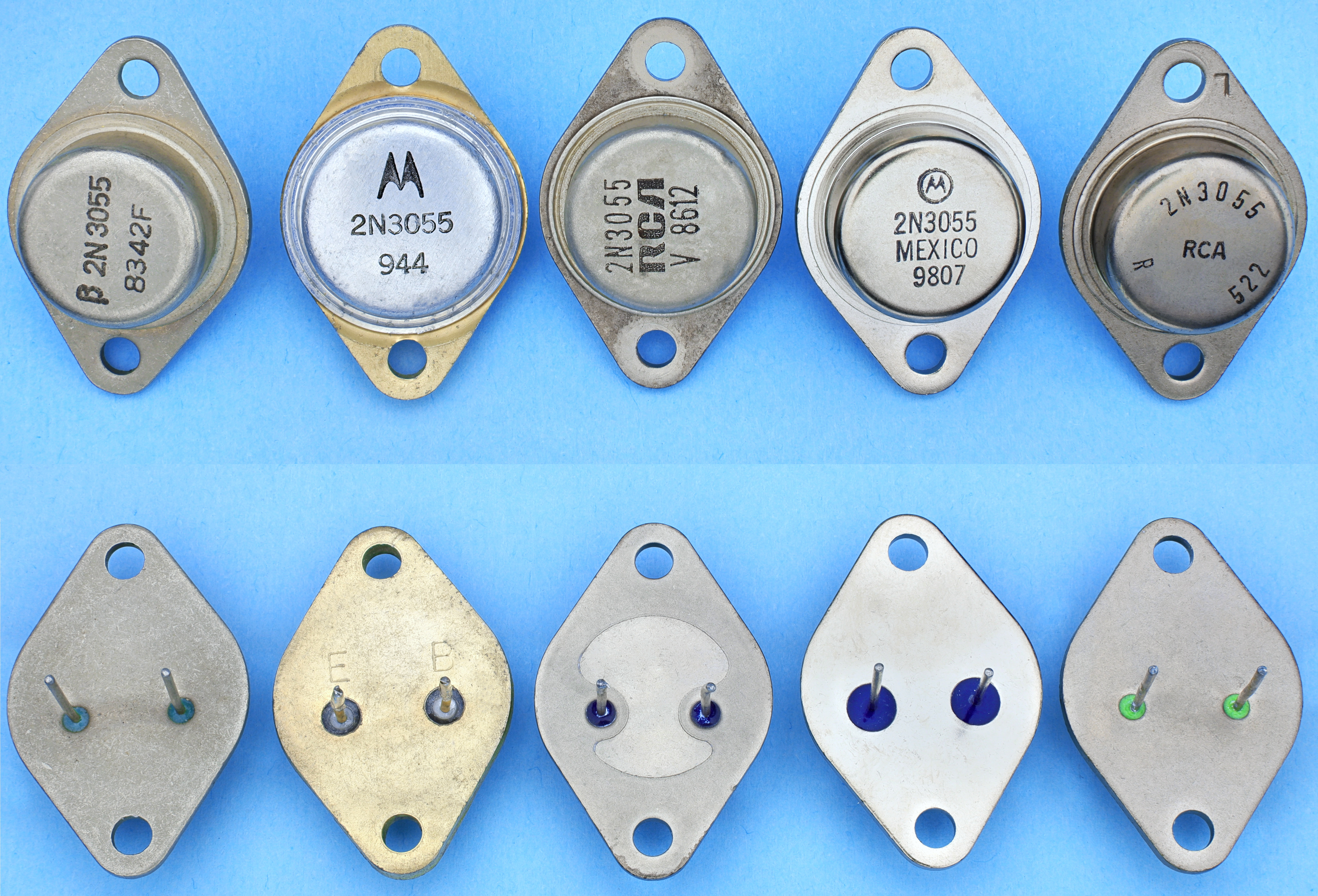
2N3055 transistors from various manufacturers.

== Specifications ==
The exact performance characteristics depend on the manufacturer and date; before the move to the epitaxial base version in the mid-1970s the f_{T} could be as low as 0.8 MHz, for example.

Manufacturer	Date	V_{CEO}	V_{CBO}	V_{CER} (100 Ω)	I_{C}	I_{B}	P_{D} (T_{C}=25C)	h_{fe} (pulsed test)	f_{T}
RCA	1967	60 V(sus)	100 V	70 V(sus)	15 A	7 A	115 W	20–70 (at I_{C} = 4 A)	not given
ON-Semiconductor	2005	60 V	100 V	70 V	15 A (cont)	7 A	115 W	20–70 (at I_{C} = 4 A)	2.5 MHz

Packaged in a TO-3 case style, it is a 15 amp, 60 volt (or more, see below), 115 watt power transistor with a β (forward current gain) of 20 to 70 at a collector current of 4 A (this may be over 100 when testing at lower currents). It often has a transition frequency of around 3.0 MHz and 6 MHz is typical for the 2N3055A; at this frequency the calculated current gain (beta) drops to 1, indicating the transistor can no longer provide useful amplification in common emitter configuration. The frequency at which gain begins to drop off may be much lower, see below.

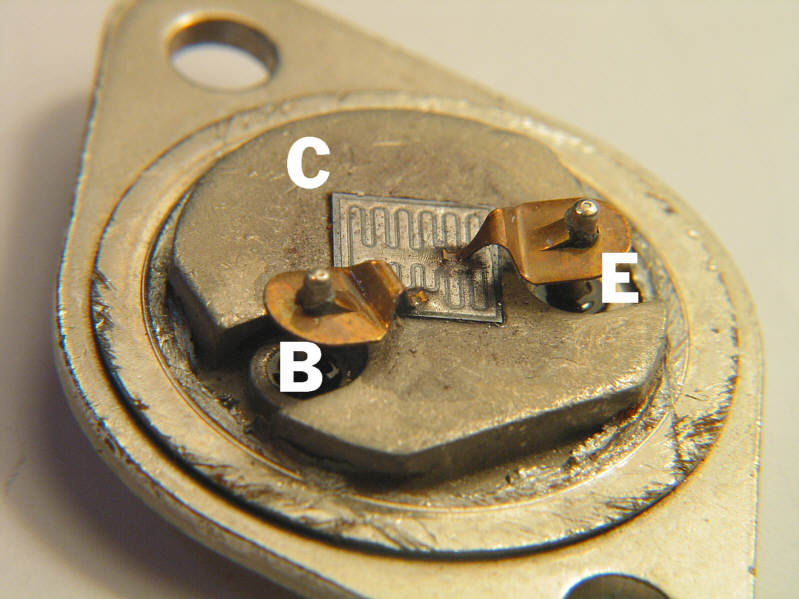
2N3055 transistor internals.

=== Maximum Ratings ===
The maximum collector-to-emitter voltage for the 2N3055, like other transistors, depends on the resistance path the external circuit provides between the base and emitter of the transistor; with 100 ohms a 70 volt breakdown rating, V_{CER}, and the Collector-Emitter Sustaining voltage, V_{CEO(sus)}, is given by ON Semiconductor. Sometimes the 100 V_{CBO} breakdown voltage (the maximum voltage between collector and base, with the emitter open, an unrealistic arrangement in practical circuits) is given as the only voltage rating, which can cause confusion. Manufacturers rarely specify the V_{CES} voltage rating for the 2N3055.

The total power dissipation (written P_{D} in most American datasheets, P_{tot} in European ones) depends on the heatsink to which the 2N3055 is connected. With an "infinite" heatsink, that is: when the case temperature is certain to be 25 degrees, the power rating is about 115 W (some manufacturers specify 117 W), but most applications (and certainly when the ambient temperature is high) a significantly lower power rating would be expected, as per the manufacturer's power derating curve. The device is designed to operate with an efficient heatsink, but care must be taken to mount the device properly, else physical damage or worsened power handling may result, especially with cases or heatsinks that are not perfectly flat.

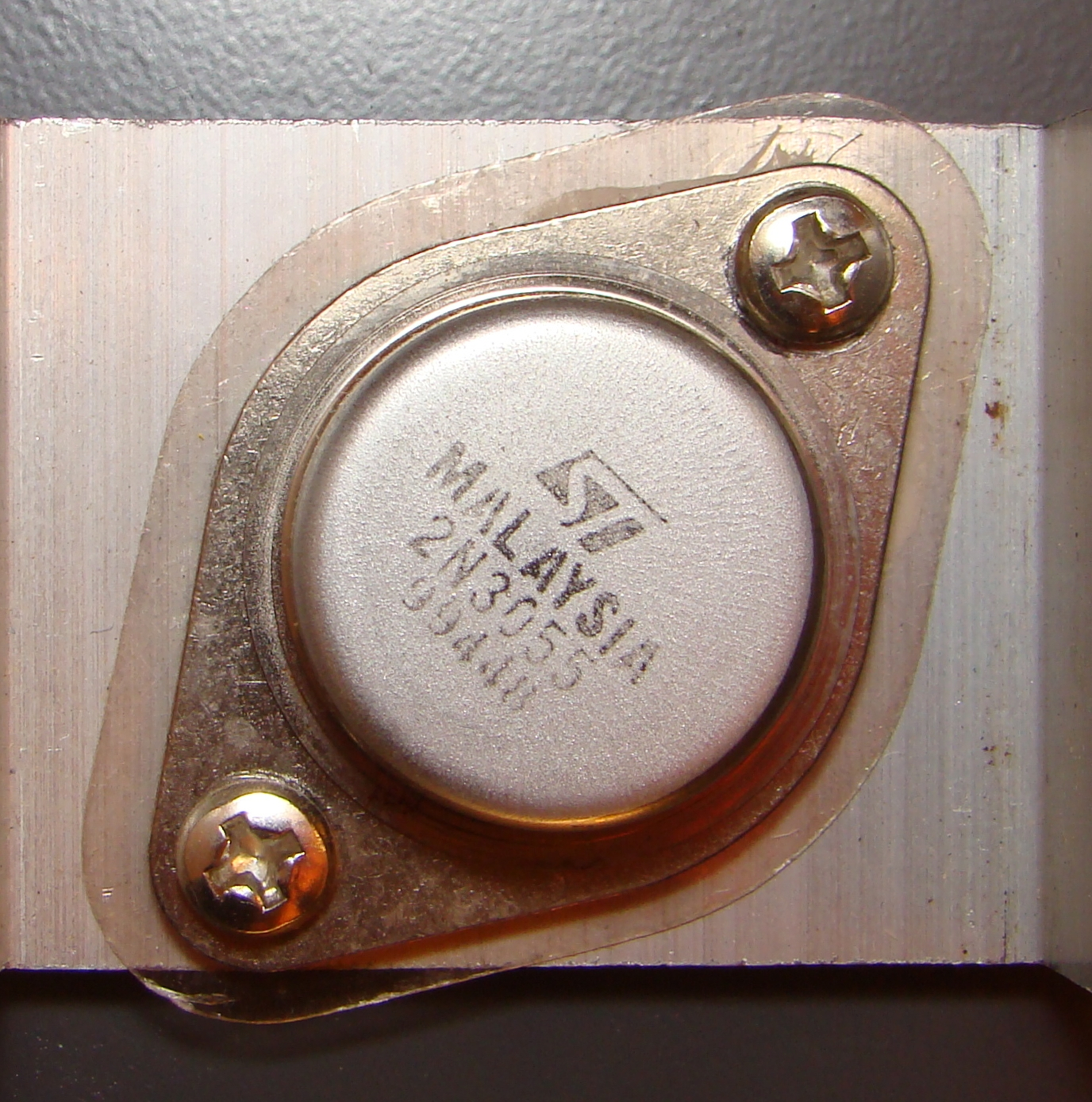
2N3055 transistor mounted on an aluminum heat sink. A mica insulator electrically isolates the transistor case from the heatsink.

=== Transition Frequency, f_{T} ===
The 1967 RCA Transistor Manual, SC-13, did not mention any measure of high frequency performance for the 2N3055; by the 1971 SC-15 manual a transition frequency, f_{T}, of at least 800 kHz was specified (at I_{C} = 1 A) and f_{hfe} (the frequency at which the small-signal current gain drops by 3 dB) was also specified at 1 A to be 10 kHz minimum. Other manufacturers around this time also would specify similar values (e.g. in 1973 Philips gave f_{T} > 0.8 MHz and f_{hfe} > 15 kHz for their 2N3055 device).

RCA by 1977 had changed their specification to give 2.5 for the minimum magnitude of the small-signal gain at f = 1 MHz, essentially giving a minimum f_{T} of 2.5 MHz (and 4 MHz for their MJ2955). Modern 2N3055 datasheets often, but not always, specify f_{T} of 2.5 MHz (minimum) because some improvements have been made over time (especially the move to the epitaxial manufacturing process). Nevertheless, a 2N3055 (and many other power transistors originating from this era) cannot be assumed to have great high-frequency performance and there can be degradation of phase-shift and open-loop gain even within the audio frequency range. Modern successors to the 2N3055 can be much more suitable in fast-switching circuits or high-end audio power amplifiers.

== History ==
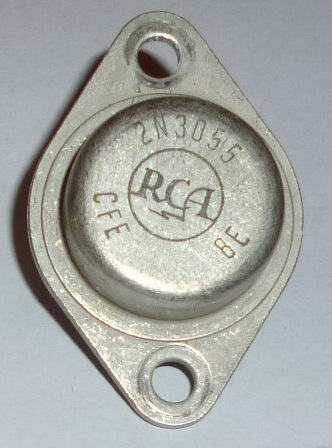
RCA 2N3055.

The historically-significant 2N3055 was designed by Herb Meisel's engineering group with RCA; it was the first multi-amp silicon power transistor to sell for less than one dollar, and became an industry workhorse standard. The 2N3054 and 2N3055 were derived from the 2N1486 and 2N1490 after package redesigns by Milt Grimes. The team of design, production, and applications engineers received RCA Electronic Components achievement awards in 1965. The 2N3055 remains very popular as a series pass transistor in linear power supplies and is still used in for medium-current and high-power circuits generally, including low frequency power converters although its use in audio power amplifiers and DC-to-AC inverters is now less common and its use in higher frequency switch-mode applications never was very practical. It was second sourced by other manufacturers; Texas Instruments listed a single-diffused mesa version of the device in an August 1967 datasheet. One limitation was that its frequency response was rather low (typically the unity-gain frequency or transition frequency, f_{T}, was 1 MHz). Although this was adequate for most of the low-frequency "workhorse" applications, and par with other high power transistors around 1970, it did bring some difficulty to high fidelity power amplifier designs around 20 kHz, as the gain begins to fall and phase shift increases.

=== Mid 1970s ===
With changes to semiconductor manufacturing technology, the original process became economically uncompetitive in the mid-1970s, and a similar device was created using epitaxial base technology. The maximum voltage and current ratings of this device are the same as the original, but it is not as immune from secondary breakdown; the power handling (safe operating area) is limited at high voltage to a lower current than the original. However, the cut-off frequency is higher, allowing the newer type of 2N3055 to be more efficient at higher frequencies. Also the higher frequency response has improved performance when used in audio amplifiers.

Although the original 2N3055 went into decline relative to epitaxial-base transistors because of high manufacturing costs, the epitaxial-base version continued to be used in both linear amplifiers and switching supplies. Several versions of the 2N3055 remain in production; it is used in audio power amplifiers delivering up to 40 W into an 8 ohm load in a push–pull output configuration.

== Related devices ==
Variants with higher voltage ratings (e.g. 2N3055HV, with a 100 V_{ceo} rating), different case material or type (e.g. steel, aluminium, or plastic with metal tab), and other variations exist, in addition to the minor variations in ratings (such as a power dissipation of 115 or 117 Watts) between 2N3055-marked devices from various manufacturers since RCA's original.

The MJ2955 (PNP), and later 2N2955, which is also manufactured using the epitaxial process today, is a complementary transistor to the 2N3055.

In the sixties and early seventies, Philips produced similar devices encapsulated in TO-3 packages under the reference BDY20 (described as being for "hifi" purposes) and BDY38 (although the BDY38 has lower voltage ratings than the 2N3055).

A TO-3 P (plastic case) version of the 2N3055 and its complementary device MJ2955 are available as the TIP3055 and TIP2955 respectively, with slightly reduced power dissipation ratings.

The 10 amp (15 amp peak), 80 watt TIP33 (NPN) and TIP34 (PNP) are plastic-cased transistors with somewhat similar characteristics to the 2N3055 and MJ2955 respectively, and available in variants with 40/60/80/100 V_{ceo} breakdown voltage ratings.

The 2N3773, with a TO-3 case has slightly lower gain but significantly higher maximum ratings (150 W, 140 V_{ceo}, 16 amps).

The 2N3054 is a much lower power version of the 2N3055, rated at 25 W, 55 V and 4 A, but became almost obsolete about the late 1980s when many TO-66 devices were withdrawn from mainstream manufacturers's lists. In many cases a TO-220 packaged version, such as MJE3055T, can be used instead of the 2N3054 as well as in some 2N3055 applications.

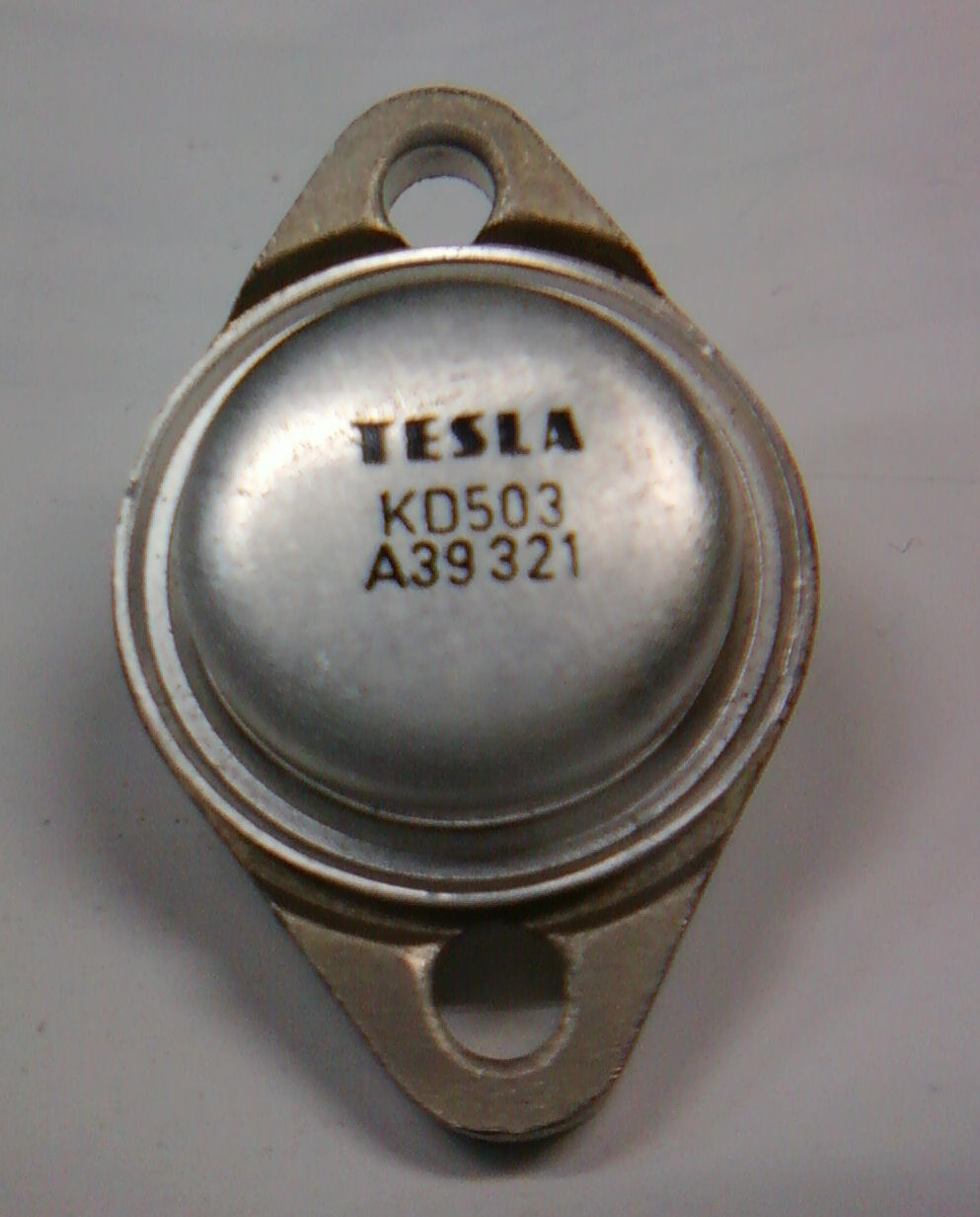
A Tesla KD503 transistor

KD503 is a higher power equivalent used in Eastern Bloc countries, and is intended for general purpose applications. It was produced exclusively by the Czechoslovak electronics company Tesla. KD503 are packaged in a TO-3 case style (called T41 by Tesla), it is a 20 amp, 80 volt, 150 watt power transistor. It has a transition frequency of 2.0 MHz;. The KD503 have higher power and higher current than 2N3055. They were used extensively in the former Eastern Bloc countries in audio power amplifiers made by Czechoslovak Tesla, Polish Unitra.

Comparison of specifications
device	manufacturer	type	case/package	V_{ceo(BR)}	I_{c} (continuous)	P_{D} (@ case=25 deg)	h_{fe}	f_{T} (MHz)
2N3055	RCA 1977 ON Semiconductor 2005	NPN	TO-3 (=TO-204AA)	60 V_{CEO(sus)}	15 A	115 W	20–70 at 4 A	2.5 MHz min (h_{fe} at 1 MHz) f_{hfe} >= 20 kHz @ 1 A
2N3055G	ON Semiconductor 2005	NPN	TO-3 (Lead-free)	60 V_{CEO(sus)}	15 A	115 W	20–70 at 4 A	2.5 MHz min (h_{fe} at 1 MHz) f_{hfe} >= 20 kHz @ 1 A
2N3055H	RCA	NPN	TO-3	60V_{CEO(sus)}	15 A	115 W	20–70 at 4 A	2.5 MHz min (h_{fe} at 1 MHz)
2N3055HV	CDIL	NPN	TO-3	100 V	15 A	100 W (some say 90 W)	20–100 at 4 A	2.5 MHz min @0.5 A
2N3772	RCA	NPN	TO-3	60 V	20 A	150 W	16–60 at 10 A	0.2 MHz min (h_{fe} >=4 at 0.05 MHz) f_{hfe} >= 10 kHz @ 1 A
2N3773	RCA	NPN	TO-3	140V	16 A	150 W	16–60 at 8 A	0.2 MHz min (h_{fe} >=4 at 0.05 MHz) f_{hfe} >= 10 kHz @ 1 A
2N6253	RCA	NPN	TO-3	45 V_{CEO(sus)}	15 A	115 W	20–70 at 3 A	0.8 MHz min (h_{fe} >=2 at 0.4 MHz) f_{hfe} >= 10 kHz @ 1 A
2N6254	RCA	NPN	TO-3	80V_{CEO(sus)}	15 A	150 W	20–70 at 5 A	0.8 MHz min (h_{fe} >=2 at 0.4 MHz) f_{hfe} >= 10 kHz @ 1 A
2N6371	RCA	NPN	TO-3	40V_{CEO(sus)}	15 A	117 W	15–60 at 8 A	0.8 MHz min (h_{fe} >=2 at 0.4 MHz) f_{hfe} >= 10 kHz @ 1 A
2N6371HV	Transys	NPN	TO-3	100 V	15 A	117 W	15–60 at 8 A	2.5 MHz min
BDP620	UNITRA CEMI	NPN	TO-3	60 V	15 A	115 W	20–40 at 4 A	0,8 MHz min
KD502	Tesla	NPN	T41 case	60 V	20 A	150 W	40-? @ 1 A	2.0 MHz min
KD503	Tesla	NPN	T41 case	80 V	20 A	150 W	40-? @ 1 A	2.0 MHz min
KD3055	Tesla	NPN	T42 case	60 V	15 A	117 W	20–70 @ 4 A	1.0 MHz min
KD3442	Tesla	NPN	T42 case	140 V	10 A	117 W	20–70 @ 4 A	1.0 MHz min
MJ2955A	Motorola	PNP	TO-3	60 V	15 A	115 W	20–100 at 4 A	2.2 MHz min @ 1 A
MJ15015G	ON Semiconductor	NPN	TO-3	120 V	15 A	180 W	20–100 at 4 A	0.8 MHz min @ 1 A
MJ15016G	On Semiconductor	PNP	TO-3	120 V	15 A	180 W	20–100 at 4 A	2.2 MHz min @ 1 A
MJE2955T	Fairchild, Central Semiconductor Corp.	PNP	TO-220	60V_{CEO(sus)}	10 A	75 W	20–100 at 4 A	2.0 MHz min (h_{fe} at 1 MHz) f_{hfe} >= 20 kHz @ 1 A
MJE3055T	Fairchild, Central Semiconductor Corp.	NPN	TO-220	60 V_{CEO(sus)}	10 A	75 W	20–100 at 4 A	2.0 MHz min (h_{fe} at 1 MHz) f_{hfe} >= 20 kHz @ 1 A
RCS617	RCA	NPN	TO-3	80 V_{CEO(sus)}	15 A	115 W	20–70 at 4 A	2.5 MHz min (h_{fe} at 1 MHz)
TIP2955	Texas Instr, Central Semiconductor Corp	PNP	TO-218AA/SOT-93	70 V_{CER} (RBE <= 100 Ohms)	15 A	90 W	20–70 at 4 A	3.0 MHz min
TIP2955	Motorola	PNP	340D-02 plastic	60 V_{CEO} 70V_{CER} (RBE = 100 Ohms)	15 A	90 W	20–70 at 4 A	2.5 MHz min
TIP3055	Texas Instr, Philips, Central Semiconductor Corp	NPN	TO-218AA/SOT-93	70 V_{CER} (RBE <= 100 Ohms)	15 A	90 W	20–70 at 4 A	3.0 MHz min
TIP3055	Motorola	NPN	340D-02 plastic	60V_{CEO} 70V_{CER} (RBE = 100 Ohms)	15 A	90 W	20–70 at 4 A	2.5 MHz min
