= 6GH8 =

Vacuum tube

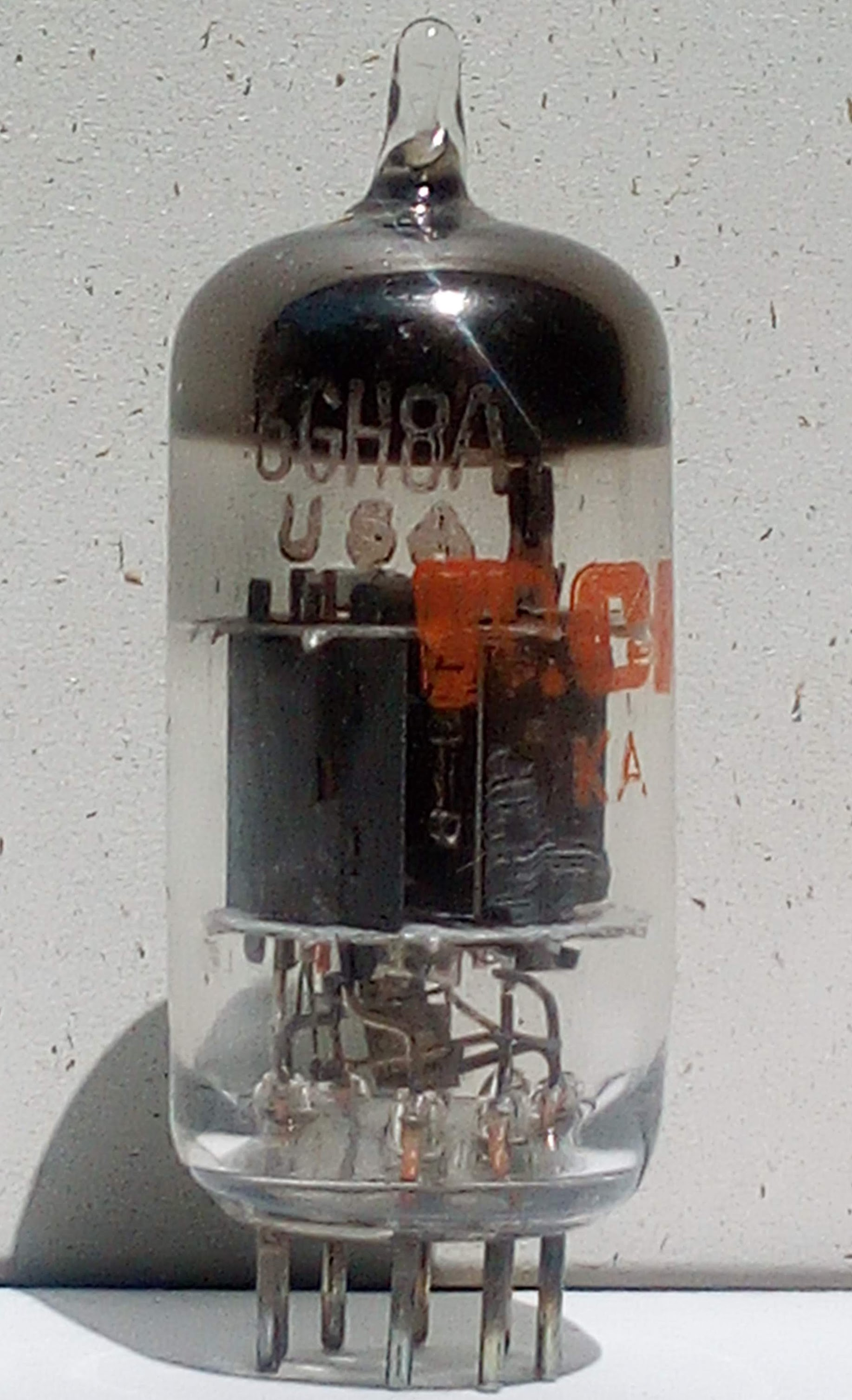
- 6GH8A
- Classification: Triode-Pentode
- Service: Color Demodulator
- Height: 1 15/16 in (49 mm)
- Diameter: 7/8 in (22 mm)

Cathode
- Cathode type: Unipotential
- Heater voltage: 6.3 V
- Heater current: 0.45 A

Anode
- Max dissipation Watts: 2.5 W
- Max voltage: 337 V

Socket connections
- E1A 9AE

The 6GH8 (More commonly labeled as the 6GH8A)is a nine pin miniature vacuum tube, produced as a combination of two sections - medium-mu Triode and sharp-cutoff Pentode - in one envelope. Each of the sections has a separate cathode and is electrically independent. The pentode section is intended primarily for service as an oscillator in the horizontal deflection systems of television receivers. Except for heater characteristics, the 5GH8 is identical to the 6GH8. Each of the sections has a separate cathode.

Commonly this type of tubes are used in radio and television receiver. The basic application of the tube is in multivibrator-type horizontal-deflection circuits, AGC-amplifier and sync-separator. They were most common and popular in RCA's CTC line of color television sets, as color demodulators. They were infamous for their failure, and therefore, often needed replacing. Other RETMA triode/pentode combinations with a 6-volts heater include: 6F7, 6P7, 6U8, 6X8, 6X9, 6AG9, 6AH9, 6AN8, 6AT8, 6AU8, 6AW8, 6AX8, 6AZ8, 6BE8, 6BH8, 6BL8, 6BR8, 6CG8, 6CH8, 6CM8, 6CS8, 6CU8, 6CX8, 6DZ8, 6EA8, 6EB8, 6EH8, 6EU8, 6FG7, 6FV8, 6GE8, 6GJ7, 6GJ8, 6GN8, 6GV7, 6GV8, 6GW8, 6GX7, 6HB7, 6HG8, 6HL8, 6HZ8, 6JA8, 6JC8, 6JN8, 6JV8, 6JW8, 6KA8, 6KD8, 6KE8, 6KR8, 6KT8, 6KV8, 6KY8, 6KZ8, 6LC8, 6LF8, 6LJ8, 6LM8, 6LN8, 6LR8, 6LX8, 6MG8, 6MQ8, 6MU8, 6MV8
