= British Radio Valve Manufacturers' Association =

Former trade association and cartel

The British Radio Valve Manufacturers' Association (BVA) was a 20th-century cartel of vacuum tube (valve) manufacturers in the United Kingdom that was designed to protect their interests from foreign competition. The cartel dictated (among other things) the price of valves and how they were numbered.

The BVA grew out of the Electric Lamp Manufacturer's Association of Great Britain (ELMA), itself a price-fixing cartel. In 1924, the valve manufacturers' committee of ELMA became the Valve Manufacturers' Association, and then in July 1926 The British Radio Valve Manufacturers' Association.

The numbering scheme was supposedly designed to make it difficult to identify American equivalents, which were typically half the British retail price in their home country; American types manufactured in the UK by companies such as Brimar sold at the same price as their UK counterparts due to the BVA's insistence. All manufacturers eventually published their own lists of 'equivalents' between their own valves and those of other manufacturers, including American types, so cross-referencing became easy, in the UK at least.

The BVA dictated that no more than one electrode structure could be contained within one envelope, because the association levied a charge of initially £1 per valveholder to cover royalties on any of its members' patent rights. Pressure from set-makers for multi-structure valves to overcome the BVA's edict led to British and European manufacturers introducing multi-structure valves, and these eventually became common.

Of twelve valve manufacturers, nine were members of the association.

Members competed freely to supply valves to radio-set manufacturers who were on the association's white-list, even selling at below cost. In contrast, replacement valves for repair of sets were sold to consumers at a far higher price, fixed by the association. This was advantageous to association members, as the market for replacement valves was far less elastic than the market for new radio sets, and furthermore, the sale of new sets created a demand for replacement valves.

Faced with the Restrictive Trade Practices Act 1956, the BVA announced its abandonment of price fixing effective from 1 September 1956, though with the caveat that it does not follow that the prices of comparable valves and tubes will necessarily vary between one manufacturer and another in the immediate future. The then members of the BVA were A.C. Cossor, Edison and Swan Electric Light Company, Ever Ready Radio Valve Company, Ferranti, GEC, Marconiphone, Mullard, Philips and STC.
