= Autodyne =

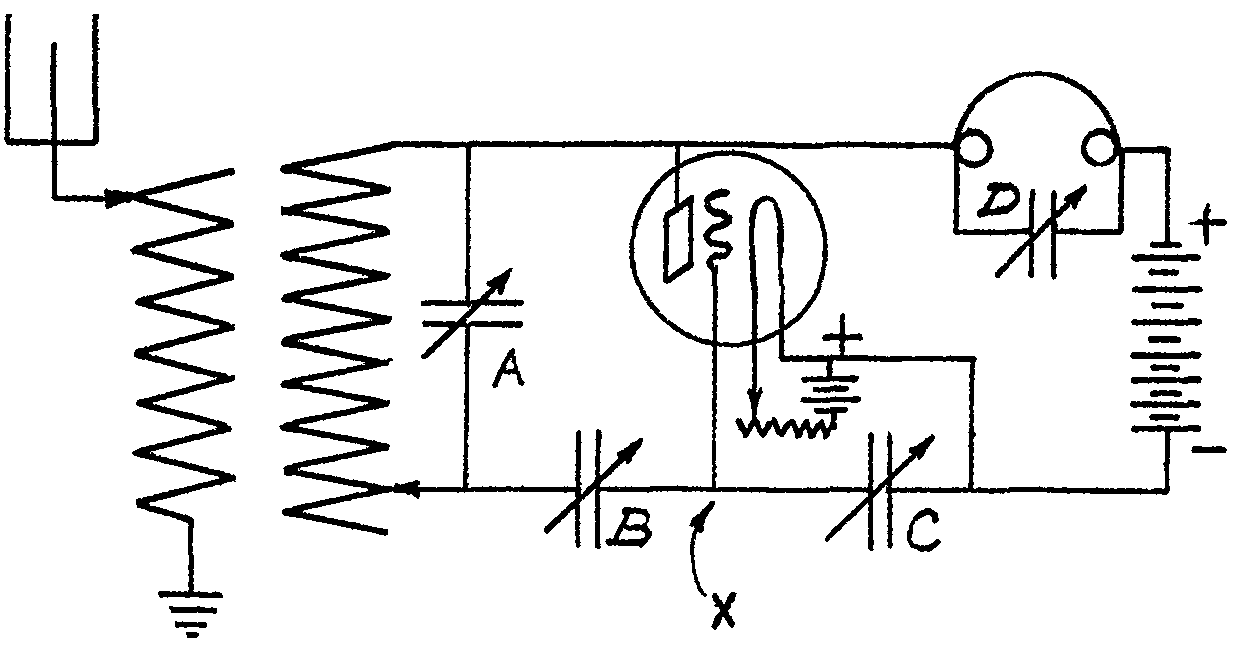
Schematic of an early autodyne receiver.

The autodyne circuit was an improvement to radio signal amplification using the De Forest Audion vacuum tube amplifier. By allowing the tube to oscillate at a frequency slightly different from the desired signal, the sensitivity over other receivers was greatly improved. The autodyne circuit was invented by Edwin Howard Armstrong of Columbia University, New York, NY. He inserted a tuned circuit in the output circuit of the Audion vacuum tube amplifier. By adjusting the tuning of this tuned circuit, Armstrong was able to dramatically increase the gain of the Audion amplifier. Further increase in tuning resulted in the Audion amplifier reaching self-oscillation.

This oscillating receiver circuit meant that the then latest technology continuous wave (CW) transmissions could be demodulated. Previously only spark, interrupted continuous wave (ICW, signals which were produced by a motor chopping or turning the signal on and off at an audio rate), or modulated continuous wave (MCW), could produce intelligible output from a receiver.

When the autodyne oscillator was advanced to self-oscillation, continuous wave Morse code dots and dashes would be clearly heard from the headphones as short or long periods of sound of a particular tone, instead of an all but impossible to decode series of thumps. Spark and chopped CW (ICW) were amplitude modulated signals which didn't require an oscillating detector. Such a regenerative circuit is capable of receiving weak signals, if carefully coupled to an antenna. Antenna coupling interacts with tuning, making optimum adjustments difficult.

== Heterodyne detection ==
=== Damped wave transmission ===
Early transmitters emitted damped waves, which were radio frequency sine wave bursts of a number of cycles duration, of decreasing amplitude with each cycle. These bursts recurred at an audio frequency rate, producing an amplitude modulated transmission. The damped waves were a result of the available technologies to generate radio frequencies. See spark gap transmitter. The transmitters could be keyed on and off to send Morse code.

Receivers could be made with a tuned circuit, a crystal detector, and a headphone. The headphone would respond to the detected bursts, and the operator could copy the Morse code. The received signal was not a sinewave. Instead of a crystal detector, a Fleming valve (tube diode) could be used; it was a stable detector, but not very sensitive. Even better was a using a vacuum triode because it provided some amplification. The regenerative receiver supplied even more gain, but required careful adjustment.

=== Undamped wave transmission ===
Damped wave transmission had drawbacks, and the focus shifted to undamped waves or continuous wave (CW) transmission. The arc converter could produce high power CW transmissions.

The typical damped wave receiver was ineffective for receiving CW because CW had, ideally, no modulation of the radio frequency during the period of the dot or dash. Several methods were employed to generate an audible tone at the receiver: (1) a chopper, (2) a variable condensor with rotating plates (slope demodulation), (3) a tikker, (4) a separate heterodyne, and (5) the autodyne.

Fessenden researched the heterodyne detector.

== Application ==
The autodyne was widely used in both commercially produced and amateur receiver designs from shortly after the time of its invention until the middle 1930s. It became popular at the beginning of the Depression (ca early 1930s) for first detector applications in superheterodyne receivers.

More recently, autodyne converters are employed in radio receivers for the AM and FM broadcast band. A single transistor combines the functions of amplifier, mixer and local oscillator of an otherwise conventional superheterodyne receiver. Such a stage accepts as input the antenna signal, and provides an output to the intermediate frequency amplifier. In this application, the transistor is made to self-oscillate at the local oscillator frequency.

The autodyne detector has appeared in specialized fields in the 1960s through the 1990s.

== See also ==
- Direct-conversion receiver (also called "homodyne" or "zero-IF" receiver)
- Frequency mixer
- Heterodyne has comments on Fessenden and theory
