= Russian tube designations =

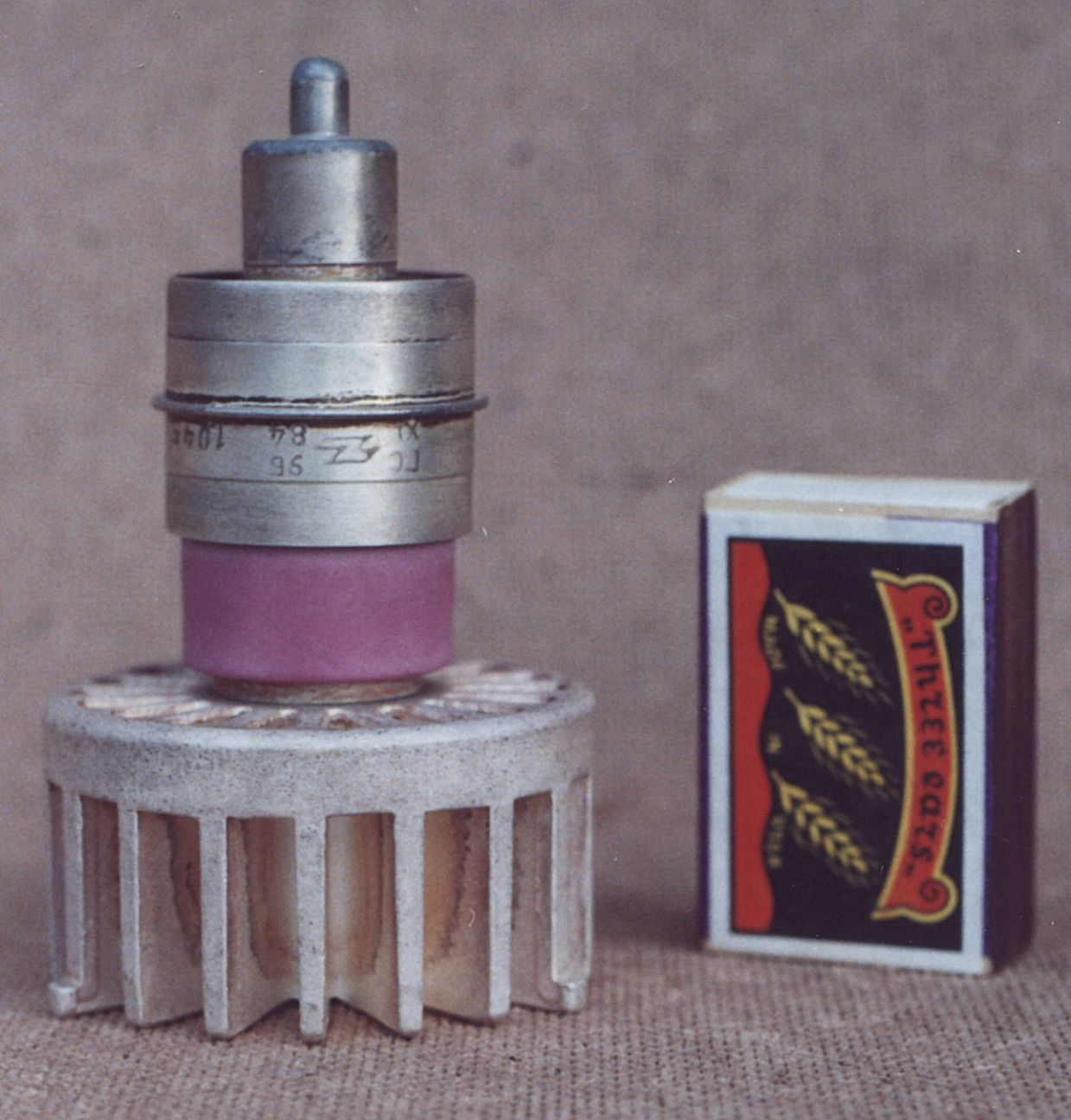
A Russian metalloceramic triode, vacuum tube used in high power

Vacuum tubes produced in the former Soviet Union and in present-day Russia carry their own unique designations. Some confusion has been created in "translating" these designations, as they use Cyrillic rather than Latin characters.

== 1929 system ==
The first system was introduced in 1929. It consisted of one or two letters and a number with up to 3 digits denoting the production number

First letter: System type:

- B (Russian: Б) – Power oscillator tube or barretter
- V (Russian: В) – Rectifier
- G (Russian: Г) – Transmitting tube ("генераторная" "generator")
- J (Russian: Ж) – Low-power oscillator tube
- M (Russian: M) – Modulator
- N (Russian: Н) – AF amplifier
- P (Russian: П) – Receiver tube
- S (Russian: С) – Special tube, such as a tetrode, a pentode or a CRT
- T (Russian: Т) – Carrier frequency tube
- U (Russian: У) – Amplifier tube

Second letter (optional): Type of cathode:

- B (Russian: Б) – Barium-coated
- K (Russian: К) – Carburized
- O (Russian: О) – Oxide-coated
- T (Russian: Т) – Thoriated
- C (Russian: Ц) – Caesium-coated

Examples:

- VO-116, VO-188, VO-202 (Russian: ВО-116, ВО-188, ВО-202) Full-wave rectifiers with an oxide-coated cathode
- SO-118 (Triode), SO-122 (Power pentode), SO-124 (Tetrode) (Russian: СО-118, СО-122, СО-124) 4-volts indirectly heated tube set for premium radios
- SO-148 (Russian: CO-148) Variable-mu tetrode with an oxide-coated cathode
- SO-242 (Russian: СО-242) Heptode with an oxide-coated cathode
- UB-110 (Russian: УБ-110) Triode with a barium-coated cathode

In 1937, the Soviet Union purchased a tube assembly line from RCA, including production licenses and initial staff training, and installed it on the Svetlana/Светлана plant in St. Petersburg, Russia. US-licensed tubes were produced since then under an adapted RETMA scheme; for example, the 6F6 thus became the 6Ф6.

== Receiver tubes ==
In the 1950s a 5-element system (GOST 5461-59, later 13393-76) was adopted in the (then) Soviet Union for designating receiver vacuum tubes.

The 1st element (from left to right) is (for receiving tubes) a number specifying filament voltage in volts (rounded to the nearest whole number).

The 2nd element is a Cyrillic character specifying the type of device:

- D (Russian: Д) – Diode, including damper diodes.
- H (Russian: Х) – Double diode.
- C (Russian: Ц) – Low-power rectifier (kenotron).
- S (Russian: С) – Triode.
- N (Russian: Н) – Double triode.
- E (Russian: Э) – Tetrode.
- P (Russian: П) – Output pentode or beam tetrode.
- J (Russian: Ж) – Sharp-cutoff pentode (also transliterated zh, sh or j).
- K (Russian: К) – Variable-mu / remote-cutoff pentode.
- R (Russian: Р) – Double pentode or double tetrode.
- G (Russian: Г) – Combined triode-diode.
- B (Russian: Б) – Combined diode-pentode.
- F (Russian: Ф) – Combined triode-pentode.
- I (Russian: И) – Combined triode-hexode, triode-heptode or triode-octode.
- A (Russian: А) – Pentagrid converter.
- V (Russian: В) – Vacuum tube with secondary emission.
- L (Russian: Л) – Nonode.
- Ye (Russian: Е) – Magic eye tube (e.g. used as a tuning indicator).
- U (Russian: У) – Power triode (was soon deprecated).

The 3rd element is a number – a series designator that differentiates between different devices of the same type.

The 4th element denotes vacuum tube construction (base, envelope):

- P (Russian: П) – Small 9-pin or 7-pin glass envelope (22.5 or 19 mm in diameter).
- R (Russian: Р) – Subminiature glass envelope with a diameter up to 5 mm
- A (Russian: А) – Subminiature glass envelope (5 to 8 mm in diameter) with flexible leads.
- B (Russian: Б) – Subminiature glass envelope (8 to 10.2 mm in diameter) with flexible leads.
- G (Russian: Г) – Glass envelope (greater than 10.2 mm in diameter)
- S (Russian: С) – Glass envelope (greater than 22.5 mm in diameter), typically with an octal base.
- N (Russian: Н) – Nuvistor.
- K (Russian: К) – Metal-ceramic envelope.
- D (Russian: Д) – Glass-metal envelope with disc connections (for UHF operation).
- J (Russian: Ж) – Acorn tube

For all-metal tubes the 4th element is omitted.

The 5th element is optional. It consists of a dash ("-") followed by a single character or a combination of characters and denotes special characteristics (if any) of the tube:

- V (Russian: В) – Increased reliability and mechanical ruggedness (such as low susceptibility to noise and microphonics).
- R (Russian: Р) – Even better than V.
- Ye (Russian: Е) – Extended service life.
- D (Russian: Д) – Exceptionally long service life.
- I (Russian: И) – Optimised for "pulsed" (i.e. switching) mode of operation.
- K (Russian: К) – Vibration-resistant

For instance, -YeV (Russian: -ЕВ) added after 6N2P (i.e. 6Н2П-ЕВ) signifies that this variant of the 6N2P has extended service life and low noise and microphonics. More often than not this means actual differences in internal construction of the tube compared to the "basic" type, but sometimes designators like -V and -I simply mean that the tube was specially selected for those characteristics from the regular-quality production at the factory.

The new designation convention was applied retrospectively to many of the previously produced types, as well as to those produced afterwards. For example, a Soviet-produced copy of the 6L6 was originally manufactured in the 1940s under its American designation (in Latin lettering), or sometimes a Cyrillic transcription of it, 6Л6. Under the above convention the tube was redesignated 6P3S (Russian: 6П3С). The 6V6 tube became 6P6S (Russian: 6П6С). However, many specialised Russian tubes, such as special military or transmitter tubes, do not follow the above convention.

Some of the better-known Russian equivalents of West European and American tubes are the 6P14P (Russian: 6П14П), an EL84; 6N8S (Russian: 6Н8С), a 6SN7; and 6P3S-E (Russian: 6П3С-Е), a version of the 6L6.

== Professional tubes ==
There is another designation system for professional tubes such as transmitter ones. A number before a cathode-ray tube designation gives the screen diagonal or diameter in centimeters (rounded to the nearest whole number)

The 1st element: Function

- V (Russian: В) – High-power rectifier
- VI (Russian: ВИ) – Pulse power rectifier
- F (Russian: Ф) – Phototube
- FEU (Russian: ФЭУ) – Photomultiplier
- G (Russian Г, "Generator" (transmitting tube), two-lettered with some notable exceptions such as the Г-807).

- GD (Russian: ГД) – Longwave tube
- GK (Russian: ГК) – Shortwave tube (≤25 MHz)
- GU (Russian: ГУ) – VHF tube (25-600 MHz)
- GS (Russian: ГС) – UHF tube (>600 MHz)
- GM (Russian: ГМ) – Modulator tube
- GI (Russian: ГИ) – Impulse tube
- GMI (Russian: ГМИ) – Pulse modulator tube
- GP (Russian: ГП) – Power tube for use in series-pass voltage regulators
- GPI (Russian: ГПИ) – Pulse power tube
- GG (Russian: ГГ) – Gas-discharge rectifier
- GR (Russian: ГР) – Mercury-vapor rectifier

- I (Russian: И) – Ignitron
- K, KU, KIU (Russian: К, КУ, КИУ) – Klystron
- LK (Russian: ЛК) – CRT for TV with magnetic deflection
- LM (Russian: ЛМ) – CRT for Radar with magnetic deflection
- LN (Russian: ЛН) – Storage CRT
- LO (Russian: ЛО) – CRT for oscilloscopes with electrostatic deflection
- LP (Russian: ЛП) – Trochotron
- MI (Russian: МИ) – Magnetron
- MU, MIU (Russian: МУ, МИУ) – Crossed-field amplifier
- OV, OVS (Russian: ОВ, ОВС) – Backward-wave amplifier
- SBM, SBT, SI (Russian: СБМ, СБТ, СИ) – Geiger-Müller counter tube
- SG (Russian: СГ) – Voltage reference
- ST (Russian: СТ ) – Baretter
- TG, TGI, TX, MTX (Russian: ТГ, ТГИ, ТХ, МТХ) – Gas-filled thyratron
- TR (Russian: ТР) – Mercury-vapor thyratron
- UV, UVI (Russian: УВ, УВИ) – Forward-wave amplifier
- EM (Russian: ЭМ) – Electrometer tube

The next elements are:

- Ignitrons, Rectifier tubes, Thyratrons:

A digit
A dash ("-")
Anode current in A
A slash ("/")
Anode voltage in kV
A letter specifying the cooling method:
- <none> – Radiation
- A (Russian А) – Water

- Transmitting tubes:

A dash ("-")
A sequentially assigned number
A letter specifying the cooling method:
- <none> – Radiation
- A (Russian А) – Water
- B (Russian Б) – Air
- P (Russian П) – Vapor

- Phototubes and Photomultipliers:

A dash ("-")
A sequentially assigned number
One or two letters:
- V (Russian В) – Vacuum
- G (Russian Г) – Gas-filled
- S (Russian С) – Caesium-activated antimony cathode
- C (Russian Ц) – Caesium cathode

Popular transmitter tubes include the ГУ-29, ГУ-50, ГМ-70 and Г-807 (the Russian 807 analogue).

== See also ==
- List of vacuum tubes
- Mullard–Philips tube designation
- RMA tube designation
- RETMA tube designation
