= RMA tube designation =

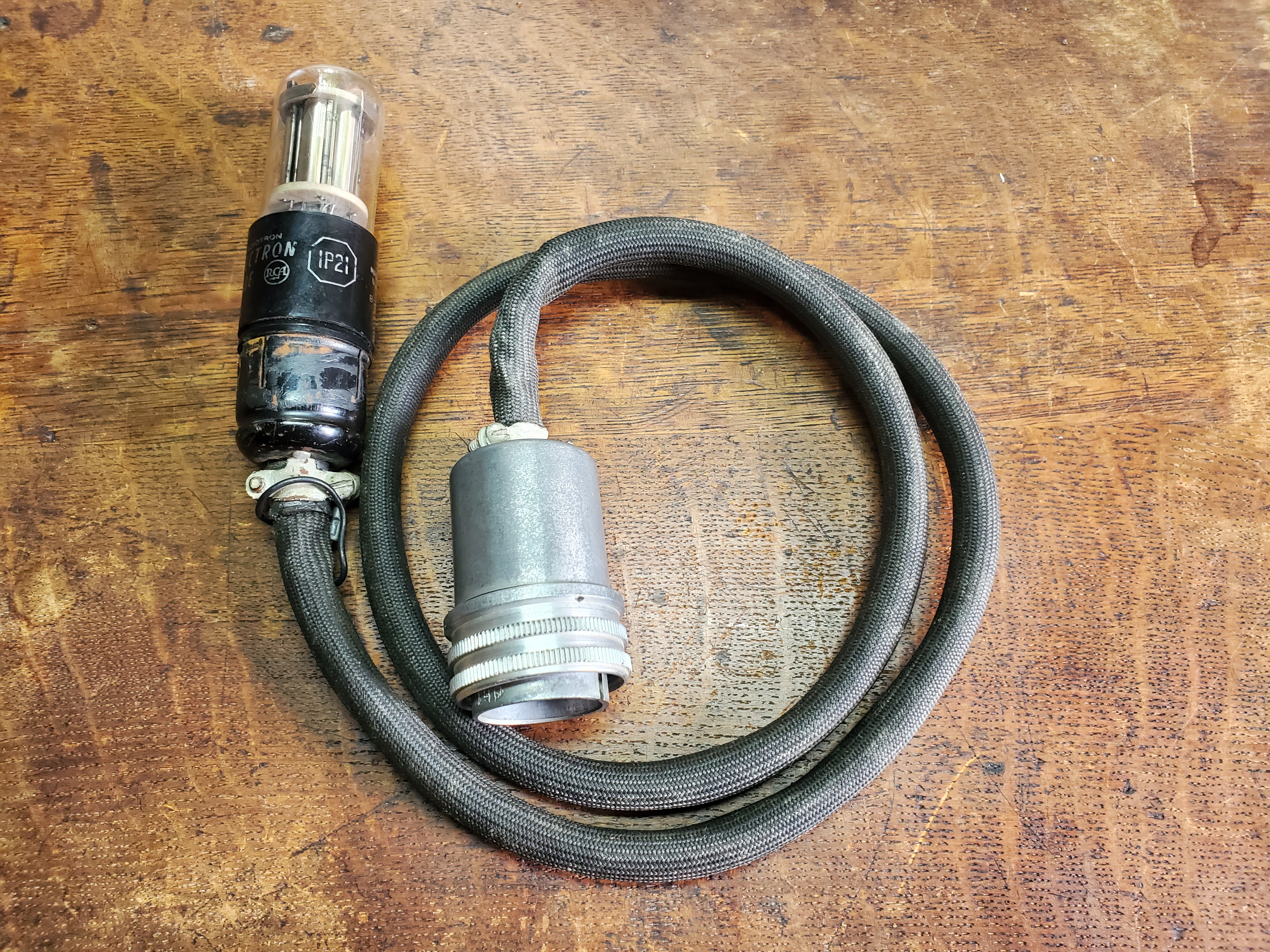
RMA 1P21 photomultiplier tube

In the years 1942-1944, the Radio Manufacturers Association used a descriptive nomenclature system for industrial, transmitting, and special-purpose vacuum tubes. The numbering scheme was distinct from both the numbering schemes used for standard receiving tubes, and the existing transmitting tube numbering systems used previously, such as the "800 series" numbers originated by RCA and adopted by many others.

The system assigned numbers with the base form "1A21", and this numbering scheme is occasionally referred to by tube collectors and historians as the "1A21 system".

The first digit of the type number was 1-9, providing a rough indication of the filament/heater power rating (and therefore the overall power handling capabilities) of the tube. The assigned numbers were as follows:

- 1-- No filament/heater, or cold cathode device
- 2-- Up to 10 W
- 3-- 10-20 W
- 4-- 20-50 W
- 5-- 50-100 W
- 6-- 100-200 W
- 7-- 200-500 W
- 8-- 500W-1 kW
- 9-- More than 1 kW

The second character was a letter broadly identifying the class of tube:

- A-- Single element (ballast, barretter)
- B-- Two-element device such as:
  - Diode
  - Transmit/receive tube (TR cell), cold-cathode water vapor discharge tube for use in radar systems, shorts the receiver input to protect it while the transmitter operates
  - Anti-transmit/receive tube (ATR cell), cold-cathode water vapor discharge tube for use in radar systems, decouples the transmitter from the antenna while not operating, to prevent it from wasting received energy
  - Spark gap
- C-- Triode
- D-- Tetrode
- E-- Pentode or beam power tetrode
- F-- Hexode
- G-- Heptode
- H-- Octode
- J-- Magnetically controlled types, usually incorporating a resonator (essentially, magnetrons)
- K-- Electrostatically controlled types, including a resonator (klystrons and inductive output tubes)
- L-- Vacuum capacitors
- N-- Crystal rectifiers (This designation lived on as the "N" in the EIA/JEDEC EIA-370 solid state device numbers standard, like 2N2222)
- P-- Photosensitive types (phototubes, photomultipliers, camera tubes, image converters)
- Q-- Resonant vacuum cavities
- R-- Ignitrons and mercury arc rectifiers
- S-- Vacuum switches
- T-- Storage, radial beam, and deflection control tubes (no known examples assigned)
- V-- Flash tubes
- W-- Travelling wave tube
- X-- X-ray tube
- Y-- Thermionic converter

The last 2 digits were serially assigned, beginning with 21 to avoid possible confusion with receiving tubes or CRT phosphor designations. Multiple section tubes (like the 3E29 or 8D21) are assigned a letter corresponding to ONE set of electrodes.

== Oddities ==
Like all tube numbering systems, there are many inconsistencies between theory and practice. For example, there is no assigned letter code for cathode-ray tubes. Some unusual types received rather mundane sounding designations, based solely on electrode count, because there was no better place to put them. For example, the 2F21 is not an actual hexode, but a pattern generating monoscope tube. Some very exotic types received generic designators, even when there was a more appropriate designator available. For example, the 2H21 "phasitron" phase modulator tube used in early FM broadcast transmitters was assigned an "H" (octode) designator, when it would have been a perfect candidate for the otherwise unused "T" category for deflection controlled tubes.

The first-digit filament/heater power rating confusingly gathers valves of widely-differing ratings. The 2G21 is a subminiature Triode-Hexode, with a maximum anode (plate) current of some 0.2 milliamps and a maximum voltage of 45 volts. The 2J42 Magnetron, with a power output of some 7 kilowatts, is rated for anode current of 4.5 amps (pulse peak) at anode voltage of 5,500 volts.

== Famous types ==
Many of the "1A21" series are well known to collectors and restorers of WW2 vintage radio equipment. A short list of well-known or historic types numbered under this system:

- 1N23—Silicon point contact diode used in early radar mixers.
- 1P25—Infrared image converter used in WW2 night vision "sniperscopes".
- 2C39--"Oilcan" type planar triode.
- 2C43--"Lighthouse" type planar triode.
- 2D21—Miniature glass tetrode thyratron used in jukeboxes and computer equipment.
- 2P23—Early image orthicon TV camera tube.
- 3B28—Xenon half wave rectifier—ruggedized replacement for mercury vapor type 866.
- 3E29—Dual beam power tube used in radar equipment—a pulse rated (5000V 8 A) variant of the earlier 829B.
- 4D21—VHF beam tetrode better known by Eimac commercial number 4-125A.
- 5C22—Hydrogen thyratron for radar modulators.
- 6C21—Triode radar modulator for "hard tube" pulsers.
- 8D21—Internally water cooled dual tetrode used in early VHF TV transmitters.

This numbering system was abandoned in 1944 in favor of a non-descriptive numbering system of 4 digit numbers beginning with 5500. This new system persisted until the final days of tubes, with type numbers registered up into the 9000 series.

== See also ==
- List of vacuum tubes
- RETMA tube designation
- Mullard–Philips tube designation
- Russian tube designations
