= Unitra =

Association of Polish electronics manufacturers

Unitra Sp. z o.o.
- Website: unitra.com

UNITRA the Association of Polish consumer electronics manufacturers was established in 1961 and lasted in its original structure until 1989. After the systemic transformation, consumer products under the Unitra brand name reappeared on the market.

== Domain of activity ==
Although the brand operated as an association of manufacturers, it had its own R & D Department. Unitra's equipment was also fabricated for the world's leading manufacturers such as the Japanese company Sanyo. Sanyo SXM-80 column speakers can be named, among others, as the result of this cooperation. In the areas where the brand lacked an adequate technological base, it entered into cooperation with manufacturers from other countries. Radio Cassette Recorder Boombox Unitra-Sankei TCR-101 makes an example of such cooperation with the Japanese enterprise Sankei.

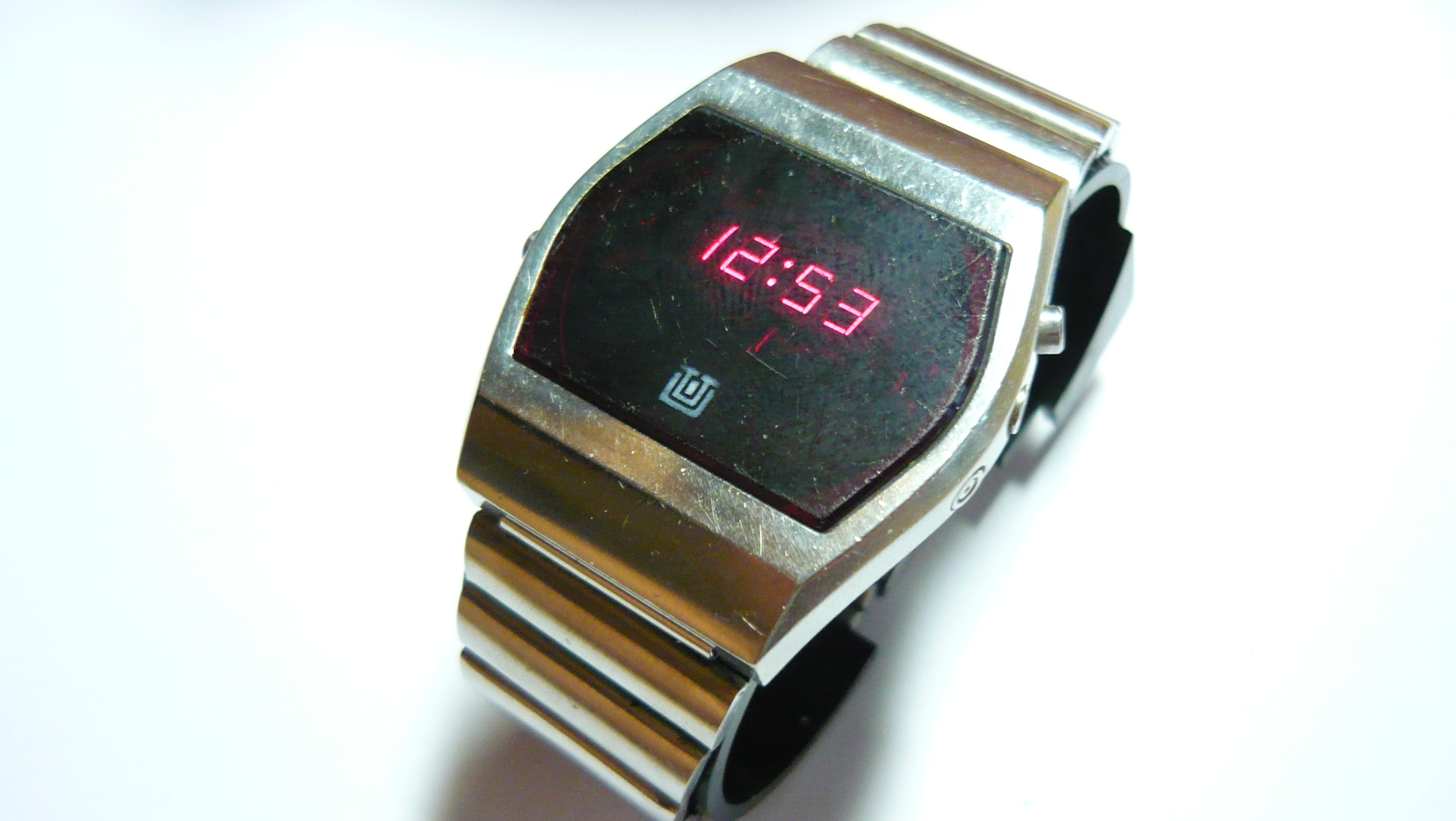
Unitra Warel wristwatch

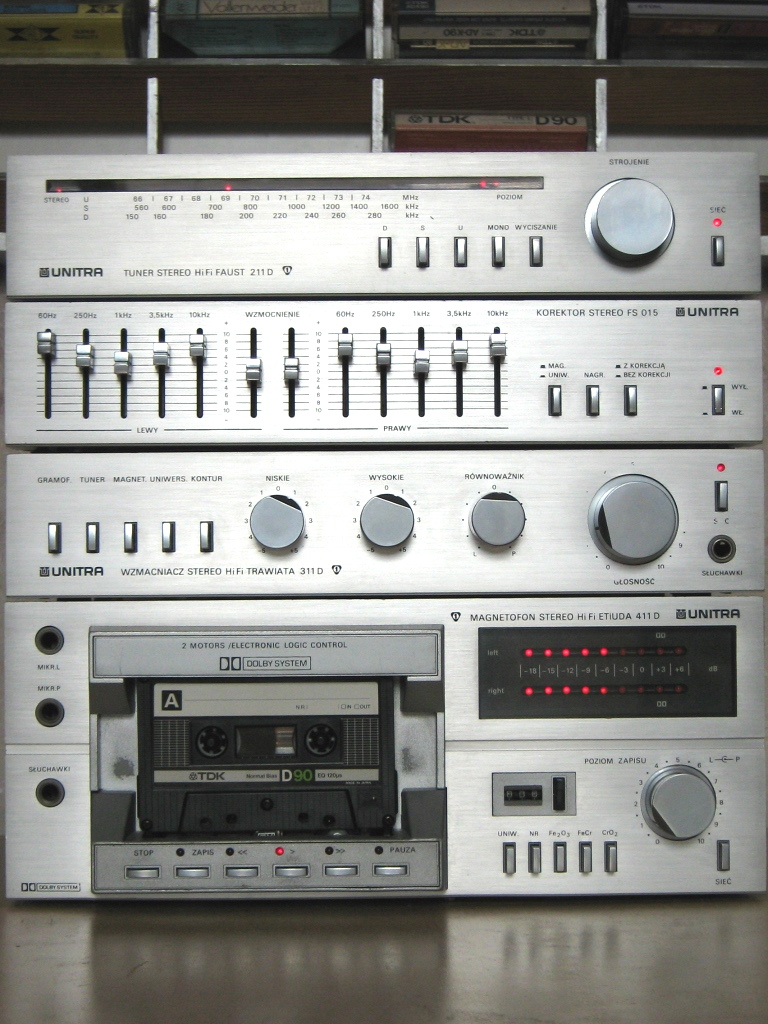
Unitra Diora HiFi set

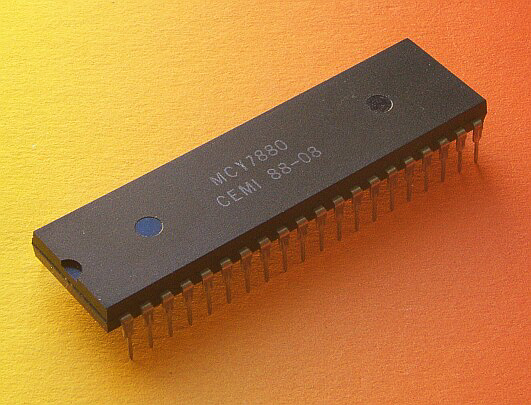
Unitra CEMI microprocessor MCY7880 (clone of the Intel 8080)

== Territorial scope ==
Products of various manufacturers operating under the common brand name were available in all the countries of Central and Eastern Europe including Poland, Czechoslovakia, Hungary and the Baltic States – Lithuania, Latvia, Estonia.

== Significant dates ==
=== Founding ===
In 1961, as a result of a merger of two smaller manufacturers’ associations, one organization named the Electronic and Telecommunication Engineering Industry Association UNITRA was founded. Throughout the whole period of its operation more than 60 different enterprises were members of the Association.

=== Systemic changes ===
As a result of the political transformation in 1989, manufacturers’ associations were disbanded. Individual companies became independent and continued their activity with varying degrees of success.

=== Reunion ===
The idea of founding an association of manufacturers reappeared in the 21st century. Currently, the equipment made under the Unitra brand name is fabricated by manufacturers specializing in audio category.

== List of associated manufactures ==
- Biazet
- CEMAT
- CEMI (Semiconductor devices)
- CERAD
- CERPO
- Diora (Hi-Fi sets)
- Dolam
- Elmasz
- Elpod
- Elpol
- Eltra
- Elwa
- Fonica (Turntables, stereo amplifiers)
- Lamina
- Unitra-Lubartów
- Magmor
- Miflex
- OBREP
- Polam
- Polkolor
- Polfer
- Profel
- Radmor
- Radwar
- Rawar
- Unitra-Rzeszów
- Telekom
- Telam
- Telpod
- Tonsil (Loudspeaker boxes)
- Toral
- Unima
- Unimor
- Unipro
- Unitech
- Unizet
- Warel
- WZT(TV sets)
- Zatra
- Zapel
- Zelos
- Zumet
- ZRK (Cassette decks, stereo receivers)

Each of these establishments used the name UNITRA, along with a stylized U trademark, before its own name.
