= Nonode =

Specialized vacuum tube

Basic FM quadrature detector circuit using a nonode

A nonode is a type of thermionic valve that has nine active electrodes. The term most commonly applies to a seven-grid vacuum tube, also sometimes called an enneode. An example was the EQ80/UQ80, which was used as an FM quadrature detector. It was developed during the introduction of TV and FM radio and delivered an output voltage large enough to directly drive an end pentode while still allowing for some negative feedback. As most of the grids were tied together, even an 8-pin Rimlock base was sufficient in the case of the EQ40.

== See also ==
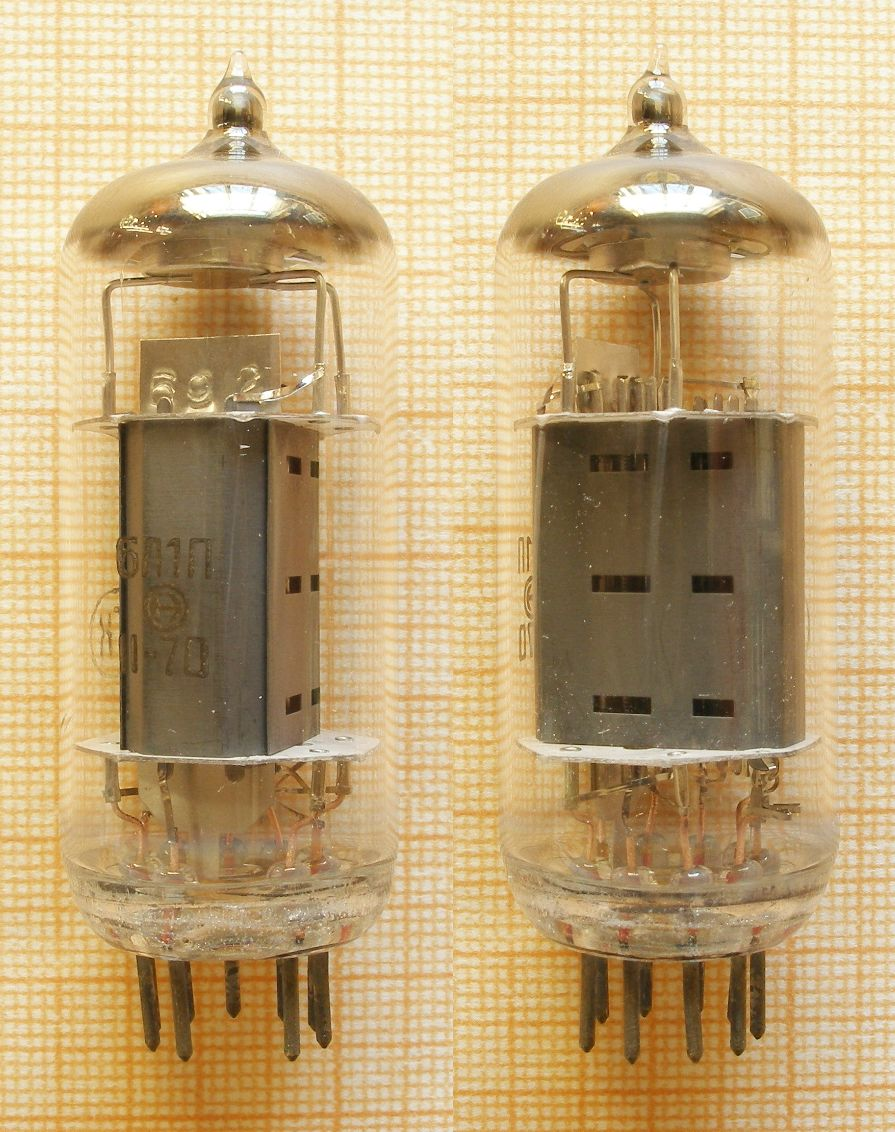
Nonode 6Л1П (6L1P), Manufactured in Novosibirsk, 1970
