= RETMA tube designation =

American vacuum tube standard

The Radio Electronics Television Manufacturers' Association was formed in 1953, as a result of mergers with other trade standards organisations, such as the RMA. It was principally responsible for the standardised nomenclature for American vacuum tubes - however the standard itself had already been in use for a long time before 1953; for example, the 6L6 was introduced in July 1936.

American-made tubes bear a RETMA designation to allow for easy cross-referencing. The RETMA tube designation does not incorporate the purpose of each tube in the designation. The Anglo-European Mullard–Philips tube designation does include tube use information in the designation.

- First figure group: indicates heater/filament voltage; 0 means a cold-cathode tube.
- Letter group: letter(s) indicate the serial order of assignment of the designation; combinations like AB, AC, AD, AE... were used, avoiding same-letter repetitions, after the single letters were exhausted. Wherever possible, the 12V equivalent of a 6V tube had the same letters, just 12 instead of 6.

- L as a first letter often indicates a lock-in (Loktal) tube.
- P as a second letter from the end indicates a CRT.
- S as a first letter indicates single-ended tubes, related to grid-cap tubes.
- S as a second letter indicates single-ended tubes.
- Letters U, V, W, X, Y and Z are commonly used for rectifiers

Occasionally the same letter groups were used for differing tubes but only where the last number would be different making the designation unique. For example there is a 12AV5 (beam tetrode), 12AV6 (double diode, triode) and a 12AV7 (double triode).

- Second figure group is the number of useful elements (including the heater if this is separate from the cathode); in metal tubes the shell counts as one element. Internal shielding also counts, but base shielding does not. Electrodes connected together internally are counted as one element. There is an inconsistency in the way tapped heaters or filaments are counted. For example, the 12BH7 (double triode with separate cathodes) counts the center tapped heater as one useful element, whereas the 12BY7 (pentode) counts the center tapped heater as two useful elements. There are also inconsistencies in the way internal screens are treated. In the 6BX6 (pentode with g3 brought to its own pin), the screen around the assembly is not counted, whereas the 6BR7 (also a pentode with g3 brought to its own pin) has its similar screen included.

In the case of a CRT, the second figure group indicates the type of phosphor the tube face was coated with.

- Optional letters:

- A, B, C Improved backward compatible versions
- E Export version
- G Glass bulb, Shouldered Tube ST-12 to ST-16 size
- GT Glass bulb, T-9 size (actually 'Glass Tubular')
- GT/G Glass bulb, T-9 size interchangeable with G and GT types
- L Loktal
- LM Loktal-metal
- LT Locking base
- M Metal envelope
- MG Metal-glass
- ML Metal-Loktal
- S Spray shielded
- W Ruggedised, or military grade
- WA, WB Improved, backward compatible military/industrial variants
- X low loss ceramic base for RF use
- Y low loss mica-filled phenolic resin ("Micanol") base for RF use

== See also ==
- List of vacuum tubes
- RMA tube designation
- Mullard–Philips tube designation
- Russian tube designations
