= Suppressor grid =

Wire screen used to suppress secondary emission in vacuum tubes

A suppressor grid is a wire screen used in a thermionic valve (i.e. vacuum tube) to suppress secondary emission. It is also called the antidynatron grid, as it reduces or prevents dynatron oscillations. It is located between the screen grid and the plate electrode (anode). The suppressor grid is used in the pentode vacuum tube, so called because it has five concentric electrodes: cathode, control grid, screen grid, suppressor grid, and plate, and also in other tubes with more grids, such as the hexode. The suppressor grid and pentode tube were invented in 1926 by Gilles Holst and Bernard D. H. Tellegen at Phillips Electronics.

In a vacuum tube, electrons emitted by the heated cathode are attracted to the positively-charged plate and pass through the grids to the plate. When they strike the plate they knock other electrons out of the metal surface. This is called secondary emission. In the four-electrode vacuum tube, the tetrode, the second grid, the screen grid, is operated at a positive voltage close to the plate voltage. During portions of the cycle when the plate voltage is below the screen grid voltage, secondary electrons from the plate are attracted to the screen grid and return to the cathode through the screen grid power supply. This flow of electrons away from the plate causes a reduction of plate current when the plate voltage increases, in other words the plate has a negative resistance with respect to the cathode. This can cause distortion in the plate waveform and parasitic oscillations called dynatron oscillations in an amplifier.

In the pentode, to prevent the secondary electrons from reaching the screen grid, a suppressor grid, a coarse screen of wires, is interposed between the screen grid and plate. It is biased at the cathode voltage, often connected to the cathode inside the glass tube. The negative potential of the suppressor with respect to the plate repels the secondary electrons back to the plate. Since it is at the same potential as the cathode, the primary electrons from the cathode have no problem passing through the suppressor grid to the plate.

In addition to preventing the distortion of plate current, the suppressor grid also increases the electrostatic shielding between the cathode and plate, causing the plate current to be almost independent of plate voltage. This increases the plate output resistance, and the amplification factor of the tube. Pentodes can have amplification factors of 1000 or more.
