= Dynode =

Electrode in a vacuum tube

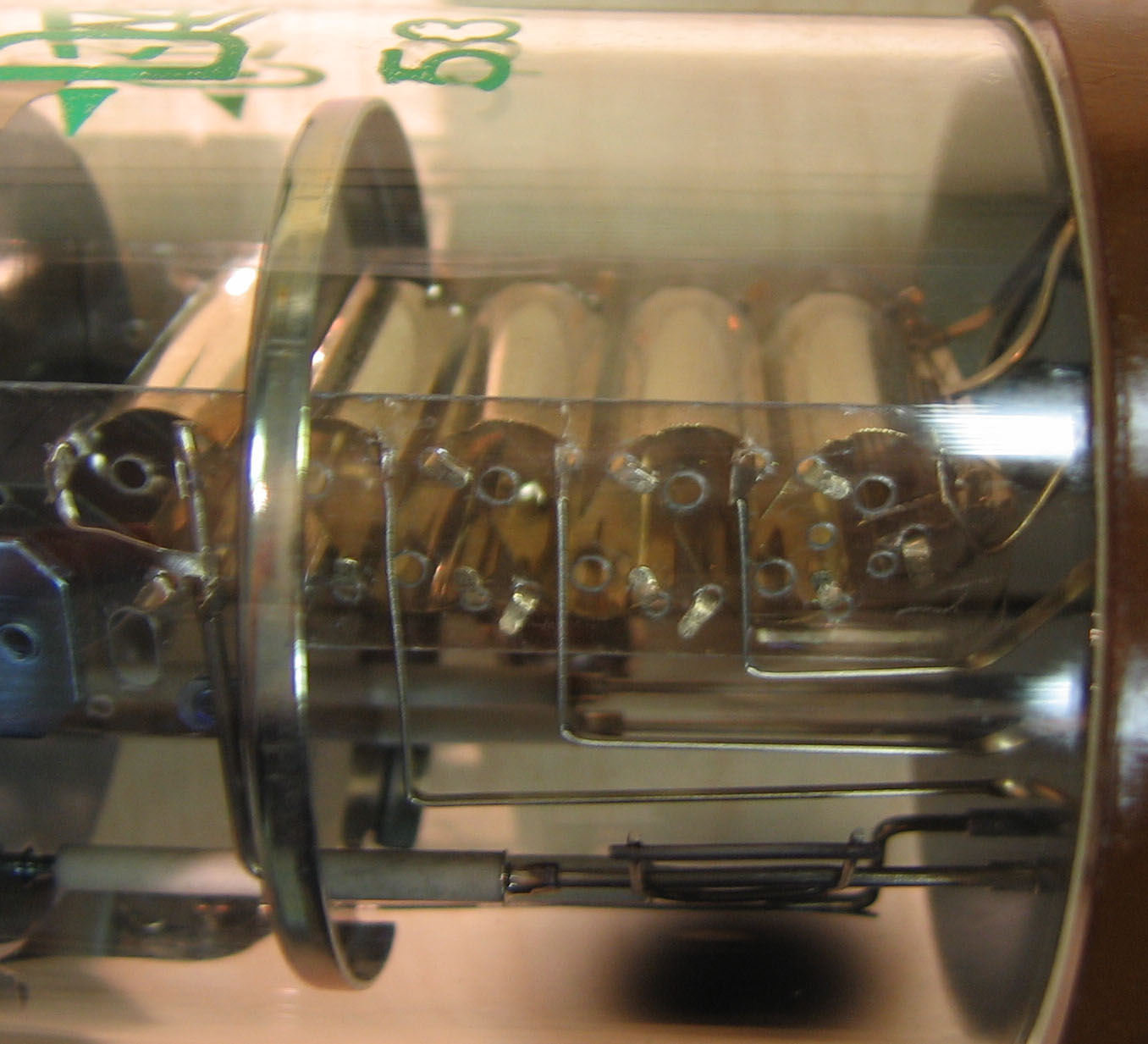
Two horizontal rows of arc-shaped dynodes in a photomultiplier tube.

A dynode is an electrode in a vacuum tube that serves as an incident charge multiplier through secondary emission. The first tube to incorporate a dynode was the dynatron, an ancestor of the magnetron, which used a single dynode. Photomultiplier and video camera tubes generally include a series of dynodes, each at a more positive electrical potential than its predecessor. Secondary emission occurs at the surface of each dynode. Such an arrangement is able to amplify the tiny current emitted by the photocathode, typically by a factor of one million.

== Operation ==
The electrons emitted from the cathode are accelerated toward the first dynode, which is maintained 90 to 100 V positive concerning the cathode. Each accelerated photoelectron that strikes the dynode surface produces several electrons. These electrons are then accelerated toward the second dynode, held 90 to 100 V more positive than the first dynode. Each electron that strikes the surface of the second dynode produces several more electrons, which are then accelerated toward the third dynode, and so on. By the time this process has been repeated at each of the dynodes, 10^{5} to 10^{7} electrons have been produced for each incident photon, depending on the number of dynodes. For conventional dynode materials, such as BeO and MgO, a multiplication factor of 10 can normally be achieved by each dynode stage.

== Naming ==
The dynode takes its name from the dynatron. Albert Hull did not use the term dynode in his 1918 paper on the dynatron, but used the term extensively in his 1922 paper. In the latter paper, he defined a dynode as a "plate that emits impact electrons ... when it is part of a dynatron."

== See also ==
- Microchannel plate detector
- Photoelectric effect
- Particle detector
- Photodetector
