= Dynatron oscillator =

Vacuum tube electronic oscillator circuit

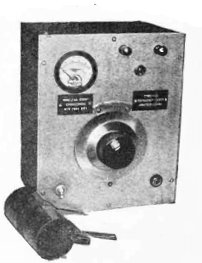
Dynatron vacuum tube signal generator, 1931. It covered the range 1.8 to 15 MHz. The circuit was used in signal generators due to its frequency stability, which was compared to crystal oscillators

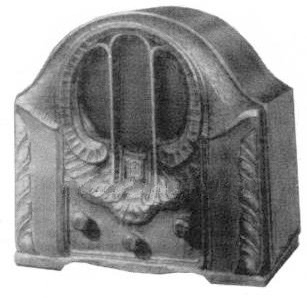
The dynatron oscillator circuit was also used as the local oscillator in early vacuum tube superheterodyne radio receivers, such as this 1931 Crosley model 122 seven tube radio.

In electronics, the dynatron oscillator, invented in 1918 by Albert Hull at General Electric, is an obsolete vacuum tube electronic oscillator circuit which uses a negative resistance characteristic in early tetrode vacuum tubes, caused by a process called secondary emission. It was the first negative resistance vacuum tube oscillator. The dynatron oscillator circuit was used to a limited extent as beat frequency oscillators (BFOs), and local oscillators in vacuum tube radio receivers as well as in scientific and test equipment from the 1920s to the 1940s but became obsolete around World War 2 due to the variability of secondary emission in tubes.

Negative transconductance oscillators, such as the transitron oscillator invented by Cleto Brunetti in 1939, are similar negative resistance vacuum tube oscillator circuits which are based on negative transconductance (a fall in current through one grid electrode caused by an increase in voltage on a second grid) in a pentode or other multigrid vacuum tube. These replaced the dynatron circuit and were employed in vacuum tube electronic equipment through the 1970s.

== How they work ==
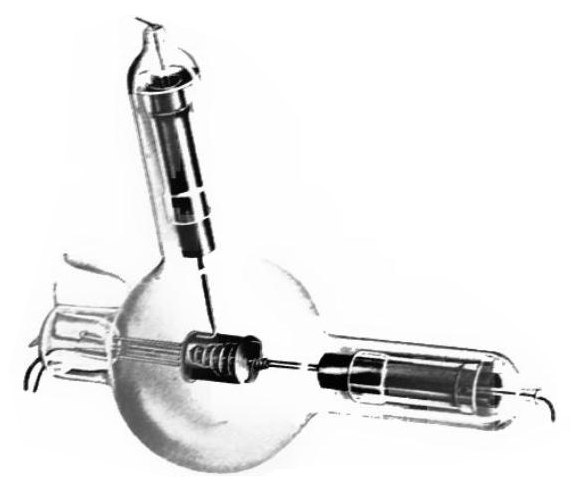
Dynatron tube, the first tube to produce dynatron oscillations, invented by Albert Hull in 1918. It saw little use since the triode and the tetrode, invented in 1926, proved capable of dynatron oscillations also.

The dynatron and transitron oscillators differ from many oscillator circuits in that they do not use feedback to generate oscillations, but negative resistance. A tuned circuit (resonant circuit), consisting of an inductor and capacitor connected together, is "almost" an oscillator: it can store electric energy in the form of oscillating currents, "ringing" analogously to a tuning fork. If a tuned circuit could have zero electrical resistance, once oscillations were started it would function as an oscillator, producing a continuous sine wave. But because of the inevitable resistance inherent in actual circuits, without an external source of power the energy in the oscillating current is dissipated as heat in the resistance, and any oscillations decay to zero.

In the dynatron and transitron circuits, a vacuum tube is biased so that one of its electrodes has negative differential resistance. This means that when the voltage on the electrode with respect to the cathode is increased, the current through it decreases. A tuned circuit is connected between the electrode and the cathode. The negative resistance of the tube cancels the positive resistance of the tuned circuit, creating in effect a tuned circuit with zero AC resistance. A spontaneous continuous sinusoidal oscillating voltage at the resonant frequency of the tuned circuit is generated, started by electrical noise in the circuit when it is turned on.

An advantage of these oscillators was that the negative resistance effect was largely independent of frequency, so by using suitable values of inductance and capacitance in the tuned circuit they could operate over a wide frequency range, from a few hertz to around 20 MHz. Another advantage was that they used a simple single LC tuned circuit without the taps or "tickler" coils required by oscillators such as the Hartley or Armstrong circuits.

== Dynatron oscillator ==
Dynatron oscillator circuit

In the dynatron a tetrode tube is used. In some tetrodes the plate (anode) has negative differential resistance, due to electrons knocked out of the plate when electrons from the cathode hit it, called secondary emission. This causes a downward "kink" in the plate current vs. plate voltage curve (graph below, grey region) when the screen grid is biased at a higher voltage than the plate, as described below. This negative resistance was mostly a feature of older tubes, of 1940s or earlier vintage. In most modern tetrodes, to prevent parasitic oscillations the plate is given a coating which drastically reduces the unwanted secondary emission, so these tubes have virtually no negative resistance "kink" in their plate current characteristic, and cannot be used in dynatron oscillators.

The tetrode wasn't the only tube which could generate dynatron oscillations. Early triodes also had secondary emission and thus negative resistance, and before the tetrode was invented they were used in dynatron oscillators by biasing the control grid more positive than the plate. Hull's first dynatron oscillator in 1918 used a special "dynatron" vacuum tube of his own design (shown above), a triode in which the grid was a heavy plate perforated with holes which was robust enough to carry high currents. This tube saw little use as standard triode and tetrodes could function adequately as dynatrons. The term "dynatron" came to be applied to all negative resistance oscillations in vacuum tubes; for example the split-anode magnetron was said to work by "dynatron oscillation".

An advantage of the dynatron circuit was that it could oscillate over a very wide frequency range; from a few hertz to 20 MHz. It also had very good frequency stability compared to other LC oscillators of that time, and was even compared to crystal oscillators. The circuit became popular after the advent of cheap tetrode tubes such as the UY222 and UY224 around 1928. It was used in beat frequency oscillators (BFOs) for code reception and local oscillators in superheterodyne receivers as well as in laboratory signal generators and scientific research. RCA's 1931 prototype television used two UY224 tubes as dynatron oscillators to generate the vertical deflection (28 Hz) and horizontal deflection (2880 Hz) signals for the CRT's deflection coils.

However the dynatron had some drawbacks. It was found that the amount of secondary emission current from the plate varied unpredictably from tube to tube, and also within a single tube over its operating life; eventually it would stop oscillating. When replacing the tube, several might have to be tried to find one that would oscillate in a circuit. In addition, since dynatron oscillations were a source of instability in amplifiers, the tetrode's main application, tube manufacturers began applying a graphite coating to the plate which virtually eliminated secondary emission. By 1945 the use of the dynatron circuit was declining.

=== Secondary emission ===
Plate current I_{P} and screen grid current I_{G2} vs plate voltage V_{P} curves of RCA's UY224 tetrode which came out in 1929, showing negative resistance region (grey). Screen grid potential V_{G2} = 75 V Control grid potential V_{G2} = −1.5 V In this tube, secondary emission was sufficiently strong that it not only caused negative resistance (a declining slope) but reversed the plate current; more electrons left the plate than arrived at it.

Plate current (I_{b}) vs plate voltage curves for tetrodes:

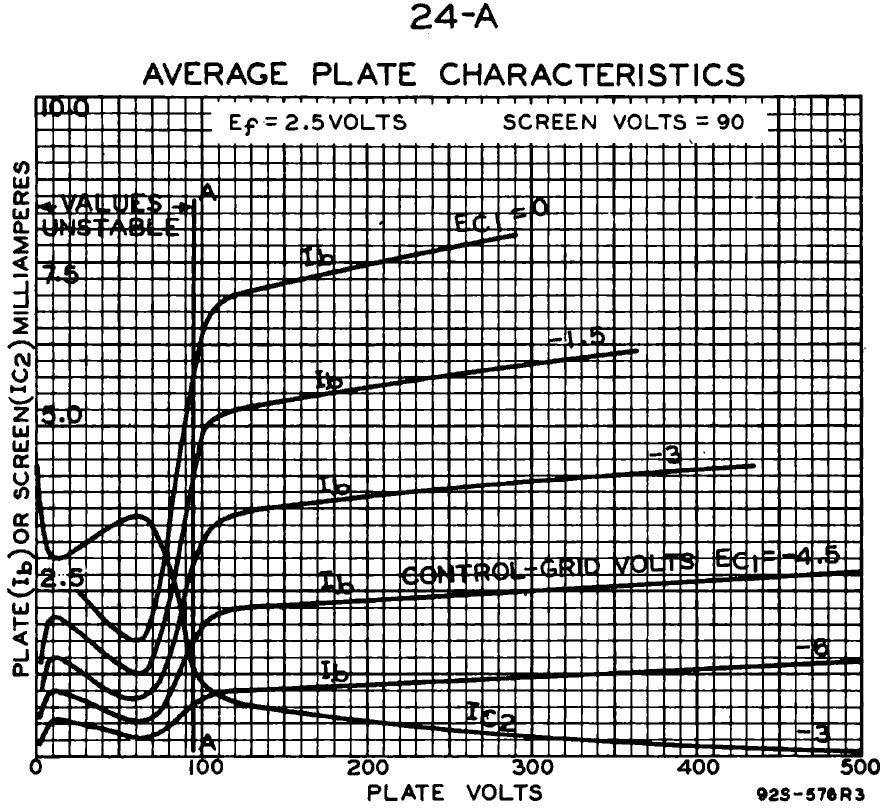
An early tetrode, the RCA 24-A from 1929, showing on the lefthand side the negative resistance "kink" in the curves due to secondary emission. At a screen voltage V_{C2} of 90 V it has negative resistance between about V_{p} = 10 to 60 V.

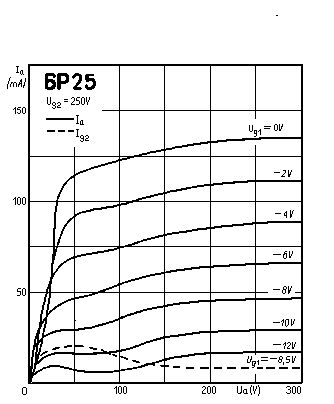
A modern tetrode, the 6P25. Due to a coating on the plate, there is very little secondary emission, so there is virtually no negative resistance region ("kink") in the curves, making this tube unusable for dynatron operation.

In an electron tube, when electrons emitted by the cathode strike the plate, they can knock other electrons out of the surface of the metal, an effect called secondary emission. In a normal tetrode amplifier this is an unwanted effect, and the screen grid next to the plate is biased at a lower potential than the plate, so these secondary electrons are repelled and return to the plate due to its positive charge.

However, if the screen grid is operated at a higher potential than the plate, the secondary electrons will be attracted to it, and return to ground through the screen grid supply. This represents a current of electrons I_{G2} away from the plate, which reduces the net plate current I_{P} below the cathode current I_{C}

$$I_P = I_C - I_{G2} \,$$

Higher plate voltage causes the primary electrons to hit the plate with more energy, releasing more secondary electrons. Therefore, starting at the voltage at which the primary electrons have enough energy to cause secondary emission, around V_{P} = 10V, there is an operating region (grey) in which an increase in plate voltage causes more electrons to leave the plate than the additional electrons arriving at the plate, and therefore a net reduction in plate current.

=== Negative resistance ===
Since in this region an increase in plate voltage causes a decrease in plate current, the AC plate resistance, that is the differential output resistance of the tube, is negative:

$$r_P = {\Delta V_P \over \Delta I_P} < 0 \,$$

As with other negative differential resistance devices like the tunnel diode, this negative resistance can be used to create an oscillator. A parallel tuned circuit is connected in the plate circuit of the tetrode. The circuit will oscillate if the magnitude of the negative plate resistance is less than the parallel resistance R of the tuned circuit, including any load connected to the oscillator.

$$|r_P| < R \,$$

The frequency of oscillation is close to the resonant frequency of the tuned circuit.

$$f = {1 \over 2\pi}\sqrt{1 \over LC} \,$$

=== Design ===
As can be seen from the graphs, for dynatron operation the screen grid had to be biased at a considerably higher voltage than the plate; at least twice the plate voltage. The plate voltage swing is limited to the negative resistance region of the curve, the downward "kink", so to achieve the largest output voltage swing, the tube should be biased in the center of the negative resistance region.

The negative resistance of older tetrode tubes was around 10kΩ - 20kΩ, and can be controlled by varying the control grid bias. If the magnitude of the negative resistance |r_{P}| is just small enough to start oscillation, just a little smaller than the positive resistance R of the tuned circuit, the oscillation frequency will be very stable, and the output waveform will be almost sinusoidal. If the negative resistance is made significantly smaller than the positive resistance, the voltage swing will extend into the nonlinear part of the curve, and the peaks of the sine wave output will be flattened ("clipped").

== Transitron oscillator ==
Transitron oscillator

Screen current and voltage in transitron oscillator. As the screen voltage V_{G2} becomes high enough that the suppressor grid voltage turns positive, electrons begin passing through the suppressor grid to reach the plate. Plate current increases and screen current decreases, giving the screen negative resistance (grey region).

The transitron oscillator, invented by Cledo Brunetti in 1939, (although a similar effect was observed in tetrodes by Balthasar van der Pol in 1926, and Edward Herold described a similar oscillator in 1935) is a negative resistance oscillator circuit using a pentode vacuum tube, in which, instead of the plate, the screen grid has negative resistance due to being coupled to the suppressor grid. See the circuit at right. In the transitron, the screen grid is biased at a positive voltage (battery B1) above the plate voltage while the suppressor grid is biased negatively (battery B2), at or below the cathode voltage. Therefore, all the electrons will be reflected by the negative suppressor grid and none will get through to the plate. The reflected electrons will instead be attracted to the screen grid, so the screen current will be high while the plate current will be zero. However, if the suppressor grid voltage is increased, as it approaches zero (the cathode voltage) electrons will begin to pass through it and reach the plate, so the number diverted to the screen grid, and thus the screen current, will decrease. Since the other grids don't take significant current the cathode current $\scriptstyle I_\text{C}$ is split between the plate $\scriptstyle I_\text{P}$ and the screen grid $\scriptstyle I_\text{G2}$:

$$I_\text{G2} = I_\text{C} - I_\text{P} \,$$

The division of current between the screen grid and plate is controlled by the suppressor voltage. This inverse relationship is indicated by saying the transconductance between the screen and suppressor grid (the change in screen current ΔI_{G2} divided by the change in suppressor voltage ΔV_{G3}) is negative.

Since the suppressor grid voltage and not the screen grid voltage controls the screen current, if the suppressor and screen grid are coupled together with a capacitor (C2) so there is a constant potential difference between them, increasing the screen grid voltage will increase the suppressor voltage, resulting in a decrease in screen current. This means the screen grid has negative differential resistance with respect to the cathode, and can be used to create oscillations.

In the transitron circuit, the screen and suppressor grids are coupled with a bypass capacitor (C2) which has a low impedance at the oscillation frequency, so they have a constant potential difference. The parallel tuned circuit (C1-L) is connected between the screen grid and the cathode (through battery B1). The negative resistance of the screen grid cancels the positive resistance of the tuned circuit, causing oscillations. As in the dynatron oscillator the control grid can be used to adjust the negative resistance.

Since the transitron oscillator didn't depend on secondary emission it was far more reliable than the dynatron. However, because the screen grid is not designed to handle high power, the oscillator's output power is limited. Other tubes with multiple grids beside the pentode, such as the hexode and pentagrid converter tube, have been be used to make similar negative transconductance oscillators. Pentode tubes used in this circuit have a negative transconductance of only around −250 microsiemens, giving a negative resistance of −4000Ω. Tubes with more grids, such as the pentagrid converter, can be used to make transitron oscillators with higher transconductance, resulting in smaller negative resistance.
