= GU-50 =

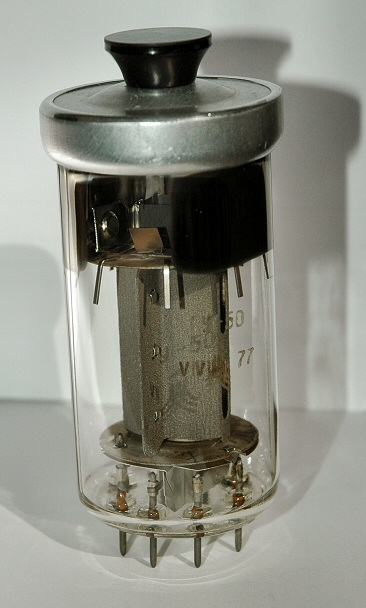
GU-50 produced in 1977 at the Ulianovsk factory

The GU-50 (Russian: ГУ-50) is a power pentode vacuum tube intended for 50 watt operation as a linear RF amplifier on frequencies up to 120 MHz. It is, in fact, a Soviet-produced copy of the Telefunken LS-50 power pentode, possibly reverse-engineered from German (Wehrmacht) military radios captured during World War II, or based on documentation, machines and materials captured as a trophy. It is one of the more unusual types of tube because of its non-standard 8-pin base and a metal "cap" (not connected to any of the tube internal elements) with a plastic "handle" on top of the envelope - which is meant to ease extracting the tube from its socket (especially when the tube is hot). One stock Russian-produced socket includes a rugged die-cast metal cage-like enclosure for the tube with spring-loaded locking lid. (The cap was made for fixation of the tube in the metal can, since tubes were designed for mobile operations). Another stock Russian-produced socket is stamped of light aluminium sheet metal, without a lid on top.

In the past the tube was very popular with Soviet and Eastern European amateur radio operators because it was commonly available (from military and government warehouses) and could produce fairly large amounts of output power using relatively simple designs. Also, it was popular in Soviet-era DIY audio amplifiers for hi-fi and musical instruments. GU-50 tubes were used also in early TV sets as a horizontal sweep output stage, and in medical devices as RF generators. The tube was never used in mass production amplifiers for civil usage because of relatively expensive technology and materials used.

During the Soviet years, the tube was produced by one of the major Soviet transmitting-tube manufacturers in the city of Ulianovsk. It was also made in Poland, in the Unitra factory. At this time it is unclear if current production of the tube exists; however, large quantities of New Old Stock (NOS) GU-50s appear to be available in the former Soviet Union and Eastern Europe and the type is far more readily found than the original LS-50.

GU-50 was not alone. There were other successors of LS-50 designed by Telefunken. Switzerland's BBC produced P50/1 and later modified version P50/2. They had the same base and pinout as the original LS-50. German Democratic Republic made a P50 that had the same bulb as Soviet ГУ-50. Later RFT made a P50-1 version of their tube. Unlike Soviet TV designers that used stock military GU-50 for their first TV sets, Eastern German manufacturers offered P50-2 especially made for TV horizontal sweep duties. There were also versions with simplified bulbs made for civil usage, but internals were still too expensive to compete with civil tubes like rugged clones of RCA 6L6 and especially designed later sweep tubes like EL500. The Western German version was called FL152 (or, with 6.3-volt heater, EL152); Eastern German version was called SRS552N. Czechoslovak company Tesla also produced copy of LS-60 under designation 6L50. It had cap and different socket, but it was electrically identical.

The tube, despite its European popularity, was not well known in U.S.A. and Canada until audiophiles rediscovered it after the collapse of Eastern political block and Soviet Union.

The Chinese version of this tube is called FU-50 and production still continues, probably by Shuguang, the major Chinese tube builder.

The tube was originally designed for mobile operations, so its filament draws only 0.705 amps of current, while anode power dissipation allowed is up to 40 watts, quite big for such low filament power. It determines the need for high anode voltage, 800 V typically. The screen grid is quite dense, so its voltage when working in pentode mode is limited by 300 volts, otherwise power dissipated by the grid when anode voltage goes below screen grid voltage would damage it. That's why the tube cannot be efficiently used in so-called "Ultra - Linear" regime when anode and screen grid have the same voltage at idle. However, in triode mode anode voltage never goes below screen grid voltage, so 400–450 volts of B+ is acceptable.

The tube can work also in so-called "Right-handed triode" mode, or "High Mu" mode, when all 3 grids are connected together and used with positive bias. In such regime, B+ voltage can be up to 1200 V, and anode curves resemble pentode ones, with higher than in the "left-handed" triode mode impedance.

Anode of the tube is made of a special nickel alloy, specially coated, so it can shortly dissipate more than 100W on anode without destruction. However, such regime causes too high temperature to be used continuously, but instead of destroying the tube like it can be expected in case of so-called "Audio Tubes" like 6L6 and successors, it causes absorption of gases making the vacuum cleaner.
