= Albert W. Hull =

American physicist and electrical engineer (1880–1966)

Albert Wallace Hull
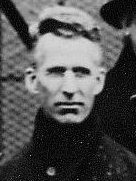
- Hull in 1921
- Born: April 19, 1880; Southington, Connecticut, U.S.
- Died: January 22, 1966 (aged 85); Schenectady, New York
- Known for: Magnetron
- Awards: Howard N. Potts Medal (1924); IEEE Morris N. Liebmann Memorial Award (1930); IRE Medal of Honor 1958

Albert Wallace Hull (19 April 1880 – 22 January 1966) was an American physicist and electrical engineer who made contributions to the development of vacuum tubes, and invented the magnetron. He was a member of the National Academy of Sciences.

== Biography ==
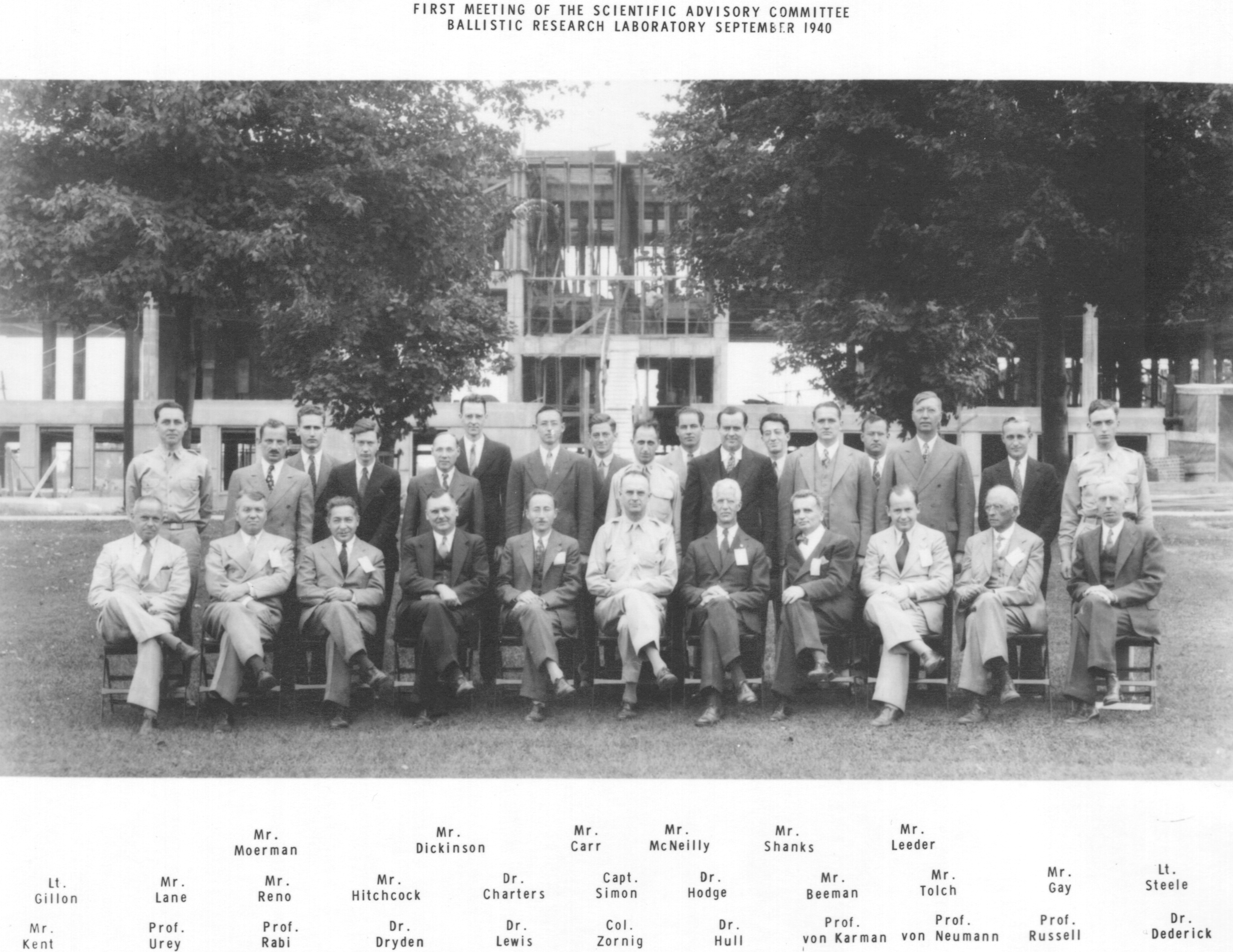
Ballistic Research Lab Advisory Committee First Meeting; Dr. Hull in front row, 5th from right

He was born on 19 April 1880 in Southington, Connecticut.

He majored in Greek and after taking one undergraduate course in physics, graduated from Yale University. He taught languages at The Albany Academy before returning to Yale, to take a doctorate in physics. He then undertook research on photoelectricity whilst teaching physics for five years at the Worcester Polytechnic Institute.

In 1914 Hull joined the General Electric Research Laboratory (GERL) in Schenectady, New York and remained there until his retirement in 1949.

During 1916, Hull began investigation into the use of magnetic control of thermionic valves (vacuum tubes) as an alternative to grid or electrostatic control and he had tested successfully magnetic control by applying a magnetic field parallel to the axis of the tube. Initially, Hull's work on these novel electron tubes was part of an effort at General Electric to develop amplifiers and oscillators that might be used to circumvent the vacuum- tube triode patents of Lee de Forest and Edwin Armstrong. Hull was promoted to assistant director of the GERL in 1928. He served as president of the American Physical Society in 1942. He retired from General Electric Research Laboratory (GERL) in 1949. He did consulting work and served on an advisory committee of the Army Ballistic Research Laboratory after retirement from General Electric.

He died on 22 January 1966 at the age of 85 in Schenectady, New York.

== Dynatron ==
He invented the dynatron vacuum tube which had three electrodes: a thermionic cathode, a perforated anode, and a supplementary anode or plate. In normal operation the supplementary anode was maintained at a lower positive voltage than the perforated anode. The secondary emission of electrons from the plate made the dynatron behave as a true negative resistance and so the tube could generate oscillations over a wide range of frequencies or be used as an amplifier. When a control grid was added between the cathode and the perforated anode, the device was called a "pliodynatron."

== Magnetron ==
By 1920 his research led to his invention of the magnetron. This took the form of a central cathode and a coaxial cylindrical anode split into two halves, with an axial magnetic field produced by an external coil. The Hull magnetron was tested as an amplifier in radio receivers and also as a low-frequency oscillator. It was reported in 1925 that a magnetron made at GERL could generate a power of 15 kW at a frequency of 20 kHz. At the time Hull anticipated that the magnetron would find greater use as a power converter than in communication applications. Hull's split-anode magnetron didn't prove to be capable of high frequency or high power output and was little used. During WWII John Randall and Harry Boot built on Hull's concept to develop the modern cavity magnetron, the first device which could produce high power at microwave frequencies, and the resulting centimeter-band radar proved a crucial advantage for the Allies in aerial warfare.

== Gas-filled electron tubes ==
During the 1920s, Hull also was a major contributor to the development of gas-filled electron tubes at the GERL. He discovered how to protect thermionic cathodes from rapid disintegration under ion bombardment. This discovery enabled the successful development of hot-cathode thyratrons (gaseous triodes) and phanotrons (gaseous diodes).

== Publications ==
In the 1918 issue of the Proceedings of the IRE he published a paper on the dynatron vacuum tube which he had invented. During his career in electronics he was the author or coauthor of 72 technical publications and was awarded 94 patents.

== Awards ==
- 1924 Howard N. Potts Medal of the Franklin Institute.
- 1930 IEEE Morris N. Liebmann Memorial Award
- 1958 IRE Medal of Honor by the Institute of Radio Engineers (IRE) "For outstanding scientific achievement and pioneering inventions and development in the field of electron tubes."
