= Plate electrode =

Type of electrode used in vacuum tubes

Cutaway diagram of a triode vacuum tube, showing the plate (anode)

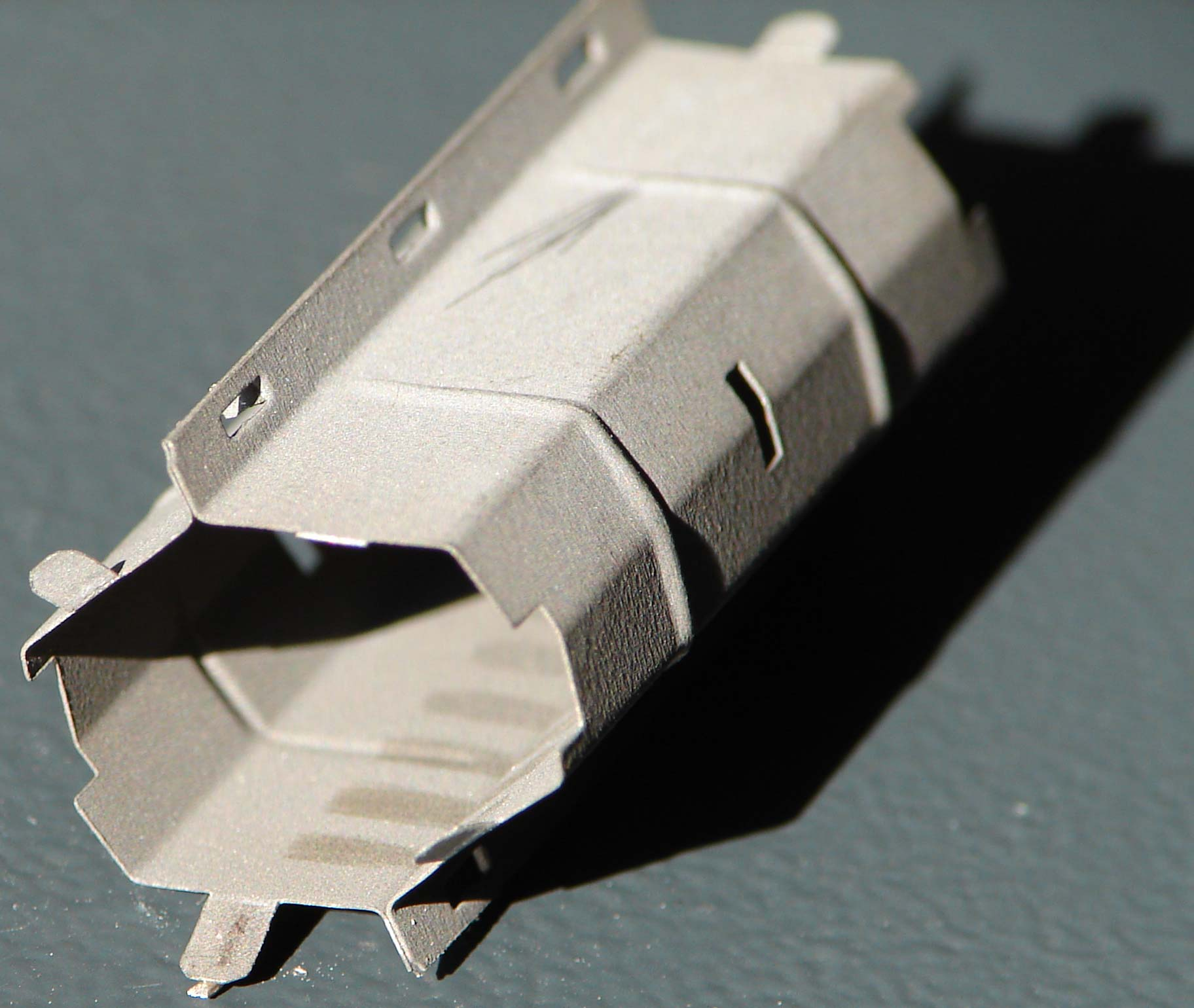
The plate from an EL84 pentode tube widely used in audio amplifiers in 1960s era radios and televisions, and still used in guitar amplifiers

Schematic symbol used in circuit diagrams for vacuum tube, showing plate

A plate, usually called anode in Britain, is a type of electrode that forms part of a vacuum tube. It is usually made of sheet metal, connected to a wire which passes through the glass envelope of the tube to a terminal in the base of the tube (or to a metal cap on the top of the tube), where it is connected to the external circuit. The plate is given a positive potential, and its function is to attract and capture the electrons emitted by the cathode. Although it is sometimes a flat plate, it is more often in the shape of a cylinder or flat open-ended box surrounding the other electrodes.

== Construction ==
The plate must dissipate heat created when the electrons hit it with a high velocity after being accelerated by the voltage between the plate and cathode. Most of the waste power used in a vacuum tube is dissipated as heat by the plate. In low power tubes it is usually given a black coating, and often has "fins" to help it radiate heat. In power vacuum tubes used in radio transmitters, it is often made of a refractory metal like molybdenum. and is part of a large heat sink that projects through the glass or ceramic tube envelope and is cooled by radiation cooling, forced air or water.

== Secondary emission ==
A problem in early vacuum tubes was secondary emission; electrons striking the plate could knock other electrons out of the metal surface. In some tubes such as tetrodes these secondary electrons could be absorbed by other electrodes such as grids in the tube, resulting in a current out of the plate. This current could cause the plate circuit to have negative resistance, which could cause unwanted parasitic oscillations. To prevent this most plates in modern tubes are given a chemical coating which reduces secondary emission.

== See also ==
- Anode
