= Pentode =

Vacuum tube with five electrodes

Graphic symbol representing a pentode of the indirectly heated cathode class Electrodes, listed from top to bottom: anode, suppressor grid, screen grid, control grid, cathode

A pentode is an electronic device having five electrodes. The term most commonly applies to a three-grid amplifying vacuum tube or thermionic valve that was invented by Gilles Holst and Bernhard D.H. Tellegen in 1926. The pentode (called a triple-grid amplifier in some literature) was developed from the screen-grid tube or shield-grid tube (a type of tetrode tube) by the addition of a grid between the screen grid and the plate. The screen-grid tube was limited in performance as an amplifier due to secondary emission of electrons from the plate. The additional grid is called the suppressor grid. The suppressor grid is usually operated at or near the potential of the cathode and prevents secondary emission electrons from the plate from reaching the screen grid. The addition of the suppressor grid permits much greater output signal amplitude to be obtained from the plate of the pentode in amplifier operation than from the plate of the screen-grid tube at the same plate supply voltage. Pentodes were widely manufactured and used in electronic equipment until the 1960s to 1970s, during which time transistors replaced tubes in new designs. During the first quarter of the 21st century, a few pentode tubes have been in production for high power radio frequency applications, musical instrument amplifiers (especially guitars), home audio and niche markets.

== Types of pentodes ==
- Ordinary pentodes are referred to as sharp-cutoff or high-slope pentodes and have uniform aperture size in the control grid. The uniform construction of the control grid results in the amplification factor (mu or μ) and transconductance changing very little with increasingly negative grid voltage, resulting in fairly abrupt cutoff of plate current. These pentodes are suitable for application in amplifier designs that operate over limited ranges of signal and bias on the control grid. Examples include: EF37A, EF86/6267, 1N5GT, 6AU6A, 6J7GT. Often, but not always, in the European valve naming scheme for pentodes an even number indicated a sharp-cutoff device while odd indicated remote-cutoff; the EF37 was an exception to this general trend, perhaps due to its history as an update to the EF36 ("The Mullard EF36, EF37 and EF37A" at the National Valve Museum).
- Remote-cutoff, variable-mu, super-control or variable slope pentodes handle much greater signal and bias voltages on the control grid than ordinary pentodes, without cutting off the anode current. The control grid of the variable-mu pentode is constructed so as to result in a given incremental change of control grid voltage having less effect on change of anode current as the control grid voltage increases negatively relative to the cathode. The control grid often has the form of a helix of varying pitch. As the control grid voltage becomes more negative, the amplification factor of the tube becomes smaller. Variable-mu pentodes reduce distortion and cross-modulation (intermodulation) and permit much larger amplifier dynamic range than ordinary pentodes. Variable-mu pentodes were first applied in radio frequency amplifier stages of radio receivers, typically with automatic volume control, and are applied in other applications requiring the ability to operate over large variations of signal and control voltages. The first commercially available variable-mu pentodes were the RCA 239 in 1932 and the Mullard VP4 in 1933.
- Power pentodes, output pentodes or power-amplifier pentodes. Power pentodes are designed to operate at higher currents, higher temperatures and higher voltages than ordinary pentodes. The cathode of the power pentode is designed to be capable of sufficient electron emission to give the required current through the tube to produce the desired power in the load impedance. The plate or anode of a power pentode is designed to be capable of dissipating more power than that of an ordinary pentode. The EL34, EL84, 6CL6, 6F6, 6G6, SY4307A and 6K6GT are some examples of pentodes designed for power amplification. Some power pentodes for specific television requirements were:
  - video output pentodes, e.g. 15A6/PL83, PL802
  - frame output or vertical deflection pentodes, such as the PL84 and the pentode sections of the 18GV8/PCL85.
  - line output or horizontal deflection pentodes, such as the PL36, 27GB5/PL500, PL505 etc.
- A "triode-pentode" is a single envelope containing both a triode and a pentode, such as an ECF80 or ECL86.

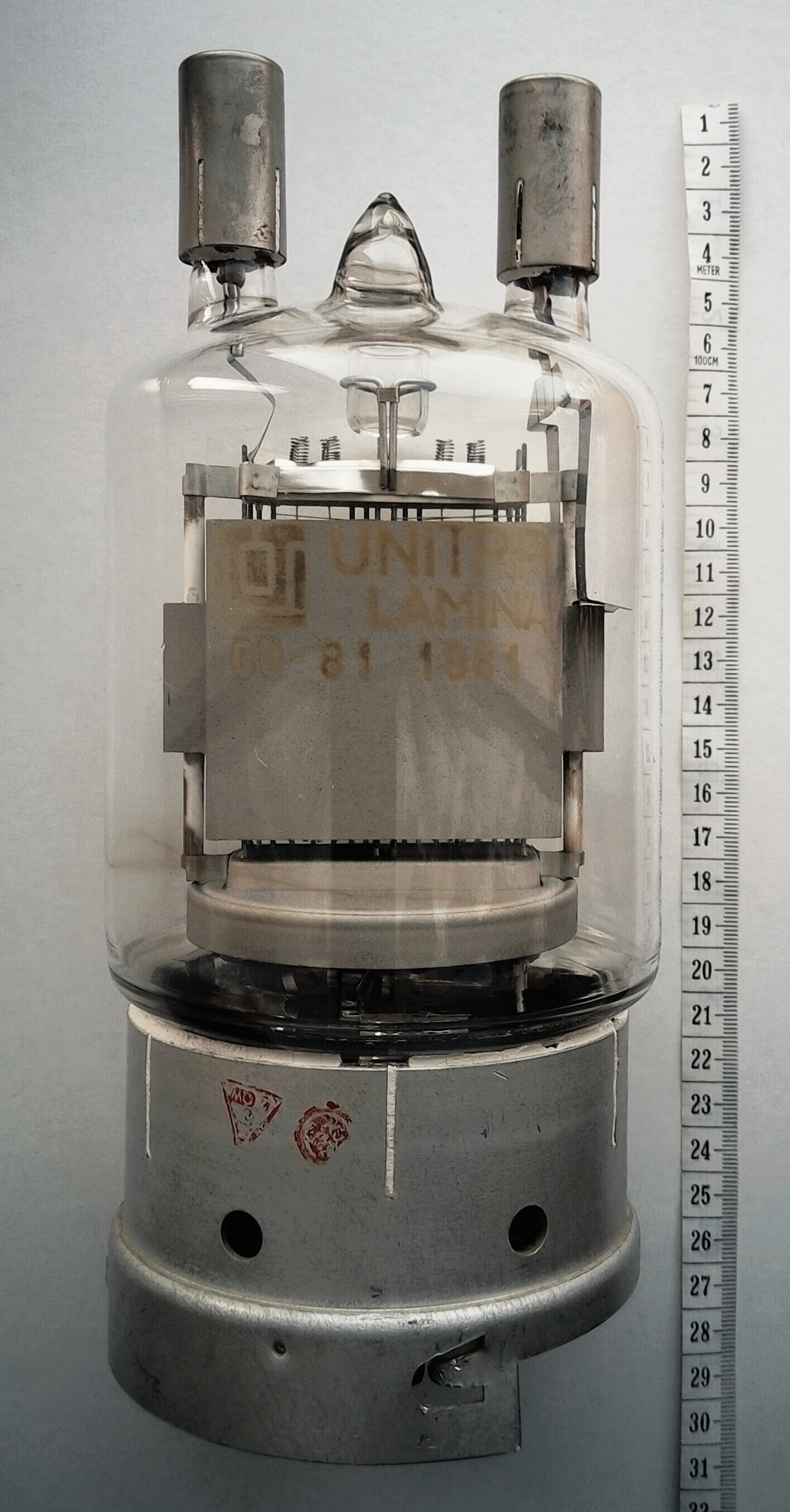
Image of a type GU-81 power pentode, a Russian electron tube used in military radio stations in the 70s and 80s

== Advantages over the tetrode ==
The simple tetrode or screen-grid tube offered a larger amplification factor, more power and a higher frequency capability than the earlier triode. However, in the tetrode secondary electrons knocked out of the anode (plate) by the electrons from the cathode striking it (a process called secondary emission) can flow to the screen grid due to its relatively high potential. This current of electrons leaving the anode reduces the net anode current I_{a}. As the anode voltage V_{a} is increased, the electrons from the cathode hit the anode with more energy, knocking out more secondary electrons, increasing this current of electrons leaving the anode. The result is that in the tetrode the anode current I_{a} is found to decrease with increasing anode voltage V_{a}, over part of the characteristic curve. This property (ΔV_{a}/ΔI_{a} < 0) is called negative resistance. It can cause the tetrode to become unstable, leading to parasitic oscillations in the output, called dynatron oscillations in some circumstances.

The pentode, as introduced by Tellegen, has an additional electrode, or third grid, called the suppressor grid, located between the screen grid and the anode, which solves the problem of secondary emission. The suppressor grid is given a low potential—it is usually either grounded or connected to the cathode. Secondary emission electrons from the anode are repelled by the negative potential on the suppressor grid, so they can't reach the screen grid but return to the anode. The primary electrons from the cathode have a higher kinetic energy, so they can still pass through the suppressor grid and reach the anode.

Pentodes, therefore, can have higher current outputs and a wider output voltage swing; the anode/plate can even be at a lower voltage than the screen grid yet still amplify well.

== Comparisons with the triode ==
- Pentodes (and tetrodes) tend to have a much lower feedback capacitance, due to the screening effect of the second grid.
- Pentodes tend to have higher noise (partition noise) because of the random splitting of the cathode current between the screen grid and the anode,
- Triodes have a lower internal anode resistance, and hence higher damping factor when used in audio output circuits, compared with pentodes, when negative feedback is absent. That also reduces the potential voltage amplification obtainable from a triode compared with a pentode of the same transconductance, and usually means a more efficient output stage can be made using pentodes, with a lower power drive signal.
- Pentodes are almost unaffected by changes in supply voltage, and can thus operate with more poorly stabilized supplies than triodes.
- Pentodes and triodes (and tetrodes) do have essentially similar relationships between grid (one) input voltage and anode output current when the anode voltage is held constant, i.e. close to a square-law relationship.

== Usage ==
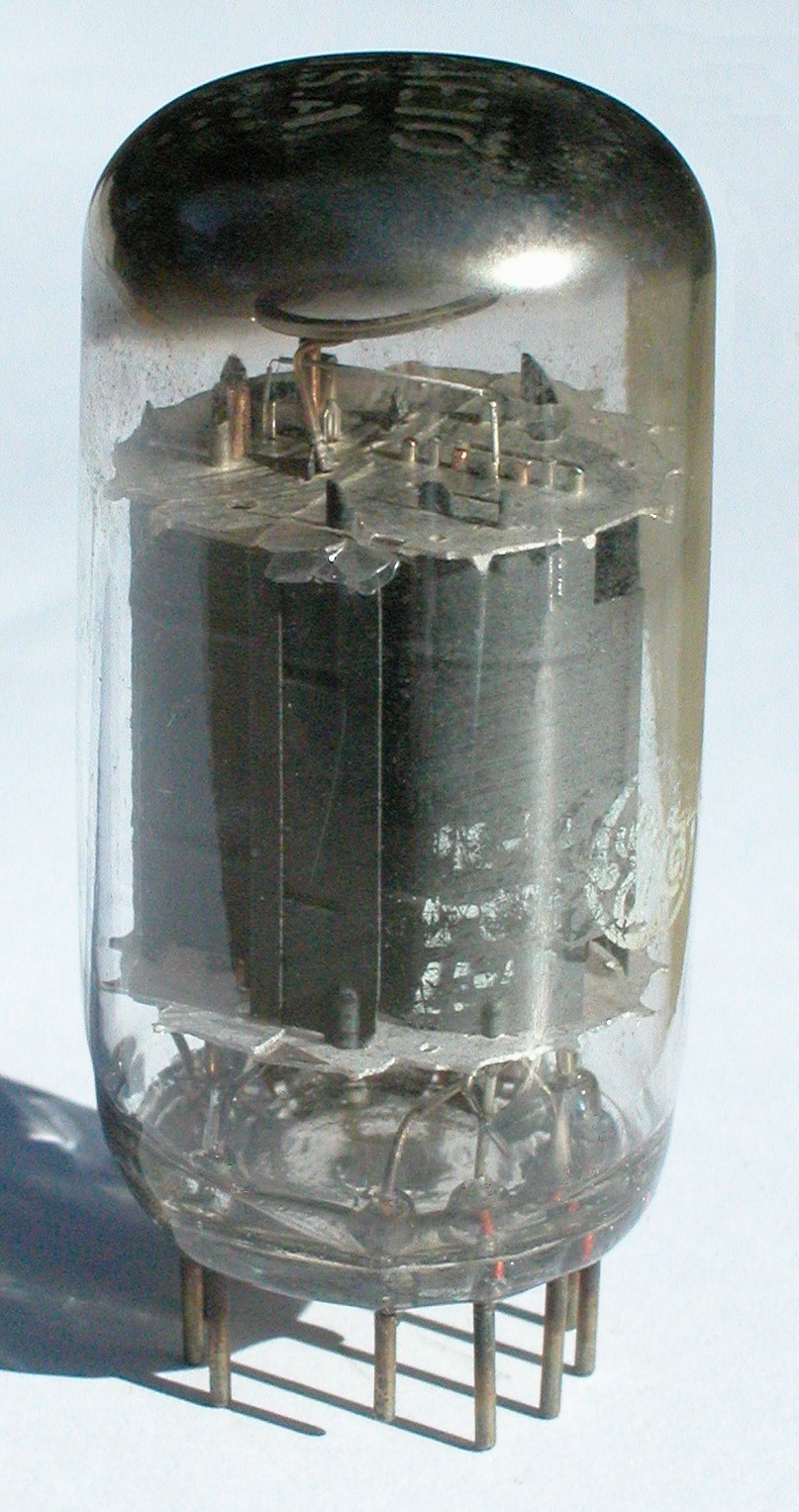
A General Electric 12AE10 double pentode

Pentode tubes were first used in consumer-type radio receivers. A well-known pentode type, the EF50, was designed before the start of World War II, and was extensively used in radar sets and other military electronic equipment. The pentode contributed to the electronic preponderance of the Allies.

The Colossus computer and the Manchester Baby used large numbers of EF36 pentode tubes. Later on, the 7AK7 tube was expressly developed for use in computer equipment.

After World War II, pentodes were widely used in TV receivers, particularly the successor to the EF50, the EF80. Vacuum tubes were replaced by transistors during the 1960s. However, they continue to be used in certain applications, including high-power radio transmitters and (because of their well-known valve sound) in high-end and professional audio applications, microphone preamplifiers and electric guitar amplifiers. Large stockpiles in countries of the former Soviet Union have provided a continuing supply of such devices, some designed for other purposes but adapted to audio use, such as the GU-50 transmitter tube.

== Triode-strapped pentode circuits ==
A pentode can have its screen grid (grid 2) connected to the anode (plate), in which case it reverts to an ordinary triode with commensurate characteristics (lower anode resistance, lower mu, lower noise, more drive voltage required). The device is then said to be "triode-strapped" or "triode-connected". This is sometimes provided as an option in audiophile pentode amplifier circuits, to give the sought-after "sonic qualities" of a triode power amplifier. A resistor may be included in series with the screen grid to avoid exceeding the screen grid's power or voltage rating, and to prevent local oscillation. Triode-connection is a useful option for audiophiles who wish to avoid the expense of 'true' power triodes.

== See also ==
- Beam tetrode
- Pentode transistor
- Valve audio amplifier technical specification
- List of vacuum tubes
