= Amplification factor =

The amplification factor, also called gain, is the extent to which an analog amplifier boosts the strength of a signal. Amplification factors are usually expressed in terms of power. The decibel (dB), a logarithmic unit, is the most common way of quantifying the gain of an amplifier.

In general an amplification factor is the numerical multiplicative factor by which some quantity is increased.

- In structural engineering the amplification factor is the ratio of second order to first order deflections.
- In electronics the amplification factor, or gain, is the ratio of output to input in an amplifier. In vacuum-tube theory the amplification factor (μ) of a triode has a more specific meaning: it is the ratio of the change in plate voltage to the change in control-grid voltage required to produce the same change in plate current. This parameter is commonly determined from families of plate-current characteristic curves as described in Vacuum tube characteristics.
- In numerical analysis the amplification factor is a number derived using Von Neumann stability analysis to determine stability of a numerical scheme for a partial differential equation.
