= Secondary emission =

When a particle's interactions with a material cause it to emit new particles

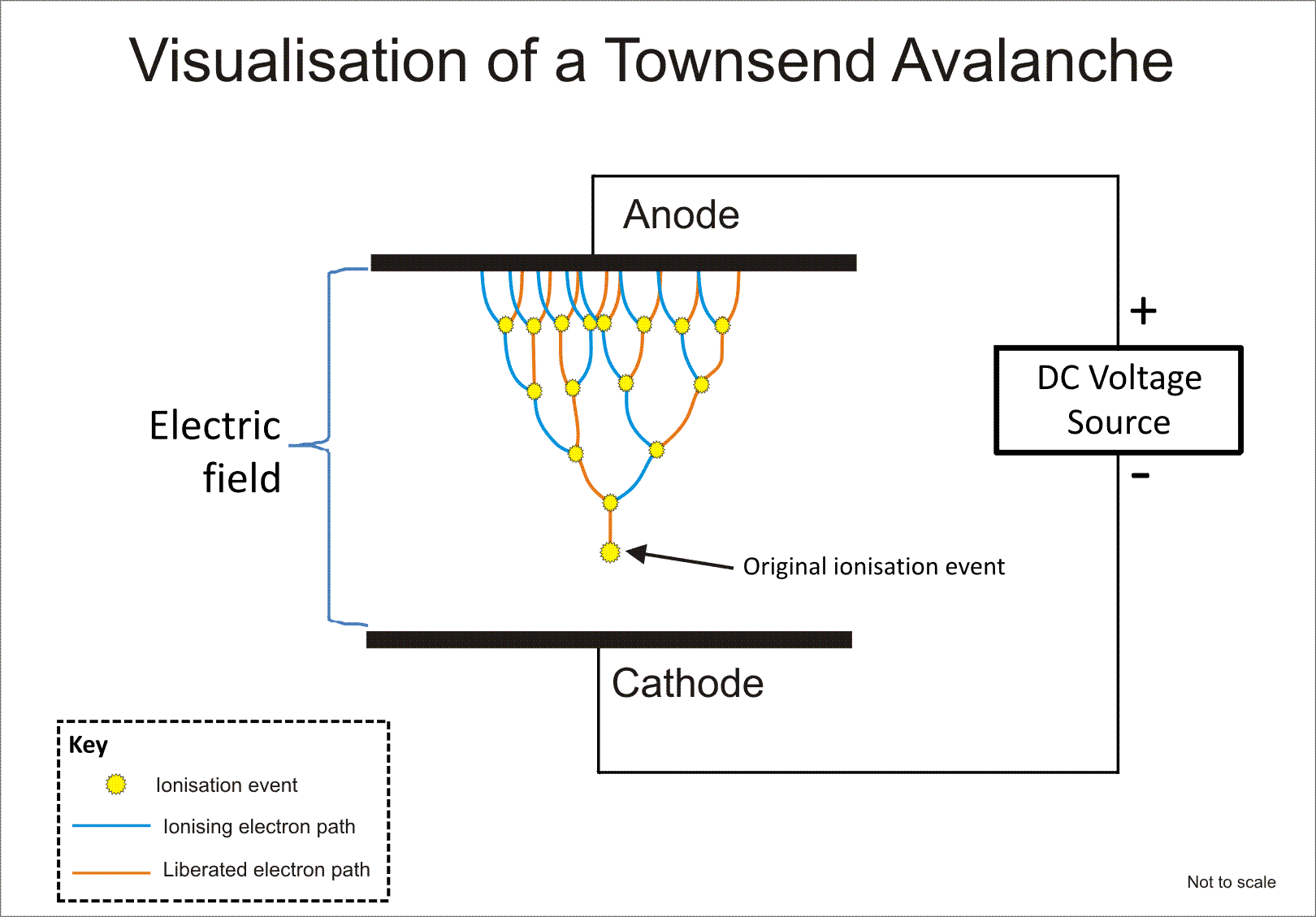
Visualisation of a Townsend avalanche, which is sustained by the generation of secondary electrons in an electric field

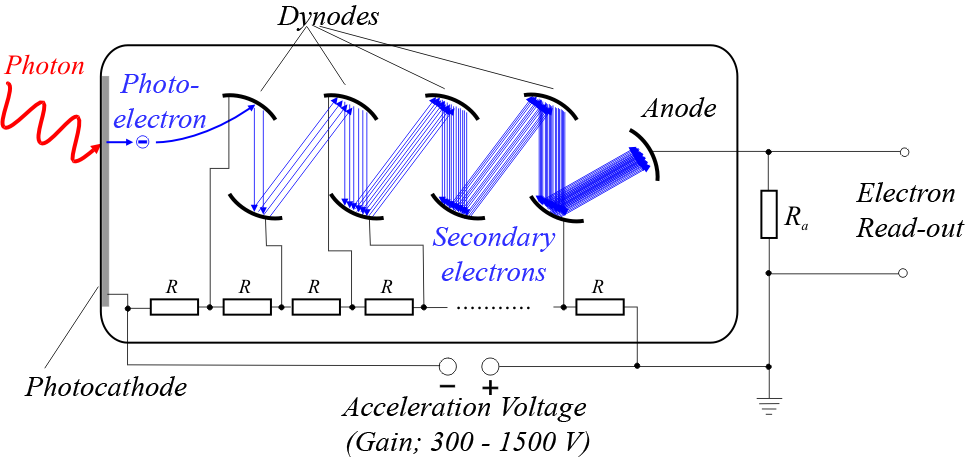
Secondary emission used in a photomultiplier tube. The initial electrons emitted when light strikes a photocathode are made to strike a dynode electrode, knocking out more electrons, which strike a second dynode. Each incident electron produces multiple secondary electrons, so the cascaded dynode chain amplifies the initial electrons.

In particle physics, secondary emission is a phenomenon where primary incident particles of sufficient energy, when hitting a surface or passing through some material, induce the emission of secondary particles. The term often refers to the emission of electrons when charged particles like electrons or ions in a vacuum tube strike a metal surface; these are called secondary electrons. In this case, the number of secondary electrons emitted per incident particle is called secondary emission yield. If the secondary particles are ions, the effect is termed secondary ion emission. Secondary electron emission is used in photomultiplier tubes and image intensifier tubes to amplify the small number of photoelectrons produced by photoemission, making the tube more sensitive. It also occurs as an undesirable side effect in electronic vacuum tubes when electrons from the cathode strike the anode, and can cause parasitic oscillation.

== Applications ==
=== Secondary emissive materials ===
Commonly used secondary emissive materials include

- alkali antimonide
- Beryllium oxide (BeO)
- Magnesium oxide (MgO)
- Gallium phosphide (GaP)
- Gallium arsenide phosphide (GaAsP)
- Lead oxide (PbO)

=== Photo multipliers and similar devices ===
In a photomultiplier tube, one or more electrons are emitted from a photocathode and accelerated towards a polished metal electrode (called a dynode). They hit the electrode surface with sufficient energy to release a number of electrons through secondary emission. These new electrons are then accelerated towards another dynode, and the process is repeated several times, resulting in an overall gain ('electron multiplication') in the order of typically one million and thus generating an electronically detectable current pulse at the last dynodes.

Similar electron multipliers can be used for detection of fast particles like electrons or ions.

== Historic applications ==
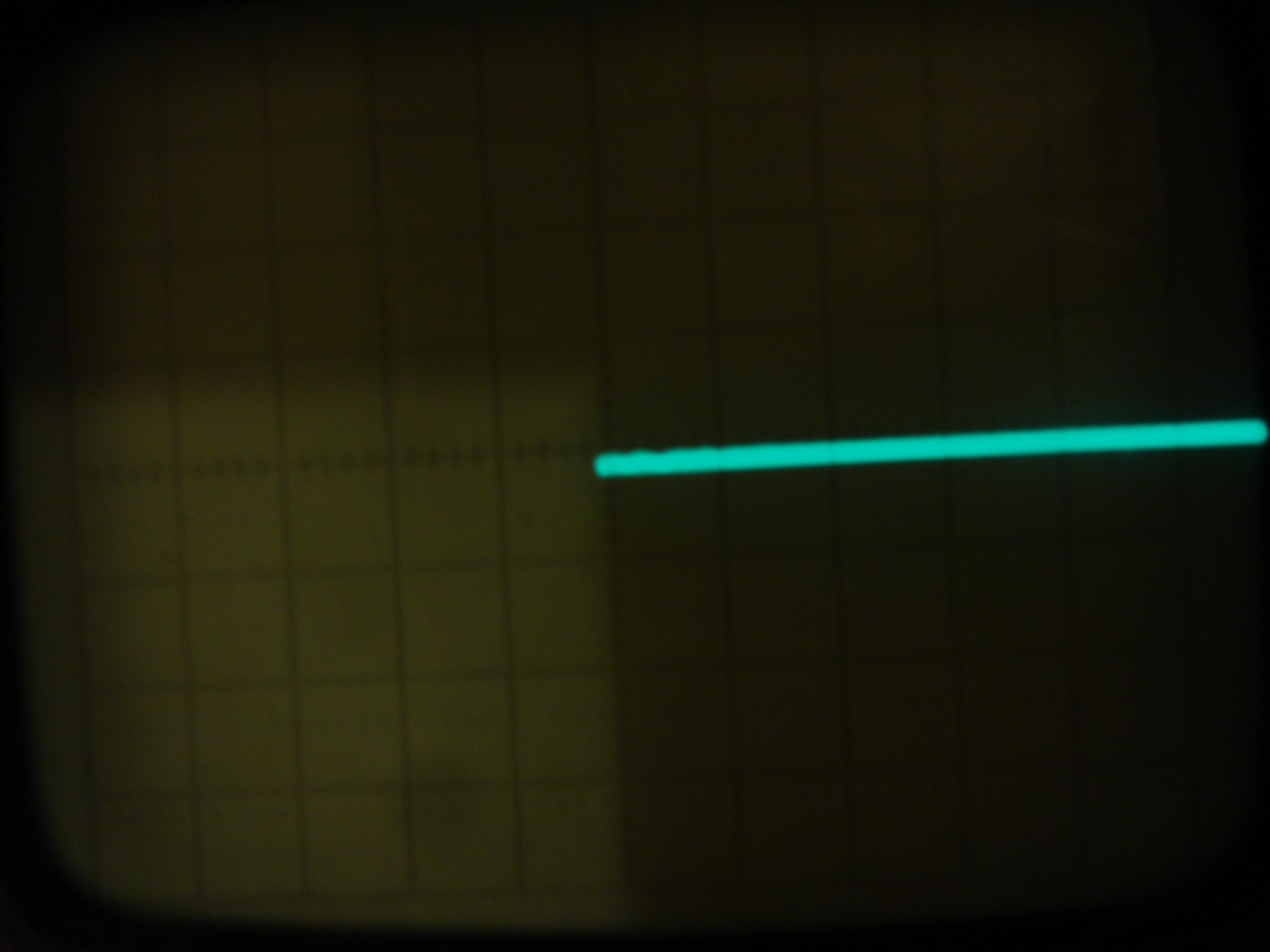
The display on an oscilloscope at normal intensity.

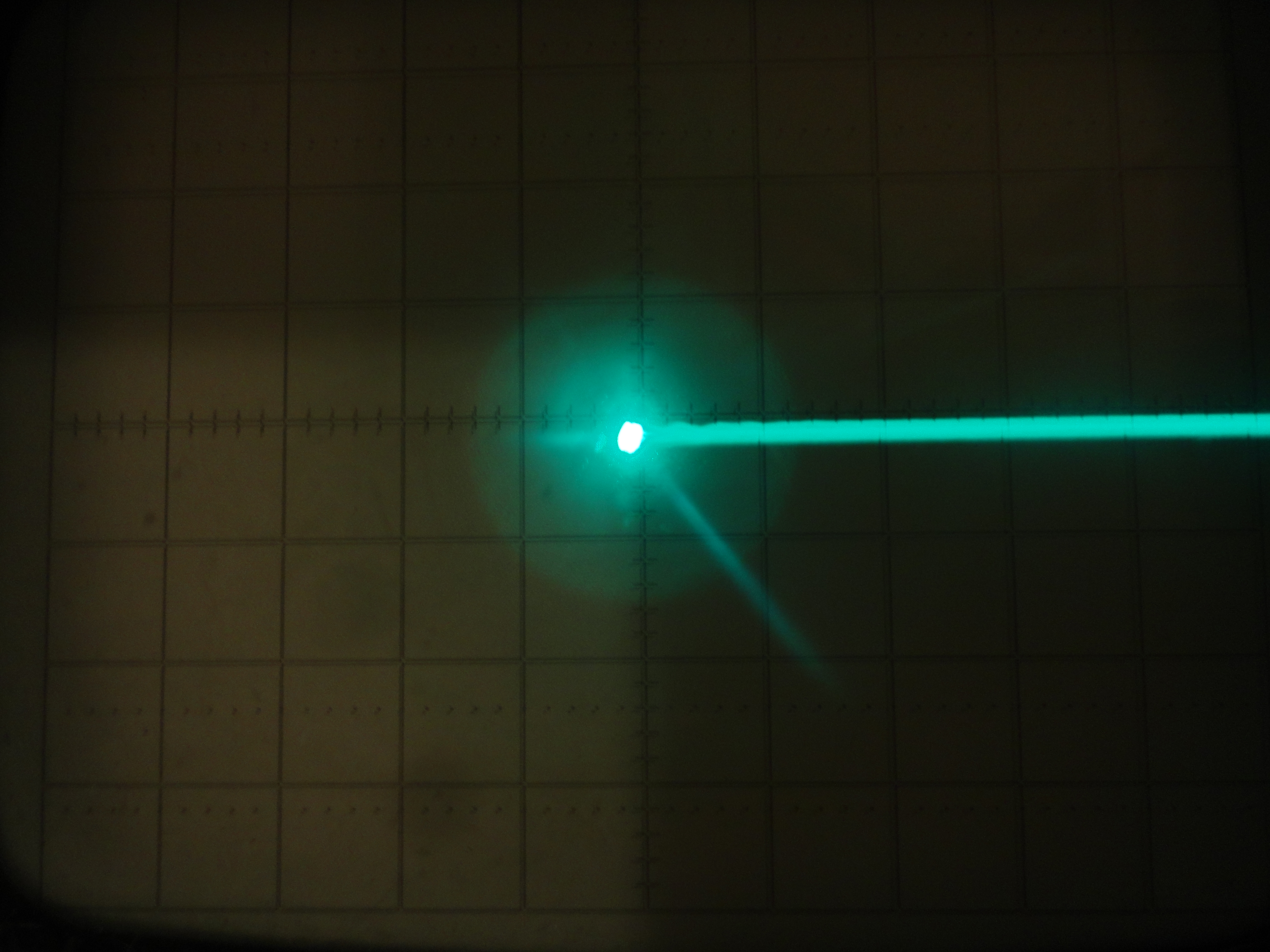
The same tube with greater intensity. The disk around the dot in the center is due to secondary emission. Electrons are struck off the screen and travel backwards into the tube. The voltage across the tube causes them to be accelerated forward again, striking the screen over a wide area.

=== Special amplifying tubes ===
In the 1930s special amplifying tubes were developed which deliberately "folded" the electron beam, by having it strike a dynode to be reflected into the anode. This had the effect of increasing the plate-grid distance for a given tube size, increasing the transconductance of the tube and reducing its noise figure. A typical such "orbital beam hexode" was the RCA 1630, introduced in 1939. Because the heavy electron current in such tubes damaged the dynode surface rapidly, their lifetime tended to be very short compared to conventional tubes.

=== Early computer memory tubes ===
The first random access computer memory used a type of cathode-ray tube called the Williams tube that used secondary emission to store bits on the tube face. Another random access computer memory tube based on secondary emission was the Selectron tube. Both were made obsolete by the invention of magnetic-core memory.

=== Undesirable effects - the tetrode ===
Secondary emission can be undesirable such as in the tetrode thermionic valve (tube). In this instance the positively charged screen grid can accelerate the electron stream sufficiently to cause secondary emission at the anode (plate). This can give rise to excessive screen grid current. It is also partly responsible for this type of valve (tube), particularly early types with anodes not treated to reduce secondary emission, exhibiting a 'negative resistance' characteristic, which could cause the tube to become unstable. This side effect could be put to use by using some older valves (e.g., type 77 pentode) as dynatron oscillators. This effect was prevented by adding a third grid to the tetrode, called the suppressor grid, to repel the electrons back toward the plate. This tube was called the pentode.

== See also ==
- Electron-cloud effect
- Malter effect
- Sputtering
