= List of Mullard–Philips vacuum tubes =

This is a list of European Mullard–Philips vacuum tubes and their American equivalents. Most post-war European thermionic valve (vacuum tube) manufacturers have used the Mullard–Philips tube designation naming scheme.

Special quality variants may have the letter "S" appended, or the device description letters may be swapped with the numerals (e.g. an E82CC is a special quality version of an ECC82)

Note: Typecode explained above. The part behind a slash ("/") is the RMA/RETMA/EIA equivalent.

== A - 4 V heater ==
=== AB ===
- AB1 – Dual diode
- AB2 – Dual diode

=== ABC ===
- ABC1 – Dual diode - triode, CBC1 with a different heater, 1930s European radios.

=== ABL ===
- ABL1 – Dual diode - power pentode, 1930s European radios.

=== AC ===
- AC2 – Triode for use as AF amplifier or as oscillator together with an AH1 mixer; side-contact 8 base, EC2 with a different heater
- AC50, 4686 – 3 mA_{avg}, 300 mA_{peak}, Argon-filled triode thyratron, side-contact 8 base with grid on top cap, for relaxation oscillators up to 50 kHz
- AC100 – Triode for use as AF amplifier or as oscillator together with an AH100 mixer; AC2 with a P5A German PTT 5-pin base
- AC101 – Triode for use as AF amplifier or as oscillator together with an AH100 mixer; AC2 with a European 5-pin base
- AC701 – Subminiature AF triode, 4-pin all-glass wire-ended with grid on top wire, for condenser microphone preamplifiers
- AC761 – Subminiature AF triode, 4-pin all-glass wire-ended with grid on top wire, for microphone preamplifiers

=== ACH ===
- ACH1 – Triode-Hexode mixer

=== A D ===
- AD1 – 4.2 W Power triode
- AD100 – 1.7 W Power triode, P7A German PTT 7-pin base
- AD101 – 1.7 W Power triode, O5A European 5-pin base
- AD102 – 5.5 W Power triode

=== AF ===
- AF2 – Remote-cutoff pentode
- AF3 – Remote-cutoff pentode. Identical to CF3 except for heater ratings
- AF7 – Sharp-cutoff pentode
- AF100 – Wide band, sharp-cutoff pentode

=== AH ===
- AH1 – Remote-cutoff Hexode for RF gain control or modulator, CH1 with a different heater
- AH100 – Remote-cutoff Hexode for RF gain control or modulator

=== AK ===
- AK1 – Octode pentagrid converter, 1930s European radios. European 7-pin base.
- AK2 – Octode pentagrid converter, CK1 with a different heater, 1930s European radios, side-contact 8 base, similar to EK2.

=== AL ===
- AL1 – AF Power pentode, 1930s European radios
- AL2 – AF Power pentode, 1930s European radios, side-contact 8 base.
- AL3 – AF Power pentode, 1930s European radios
- AL4 – AF Power pentode, 1930s European radios
- AL5 – Identical to EL5 except for heater ratings
- AL860 – RF/AF Power pentode, noval base

=== AM ===
- AM1 – Top-view, "Magic Cross"-type tuning indicator, EM1 with a different heater
- AM2, 4677 – Top-view, "Magic Eye"-type tuning indicator, identical to CM2 and EM2 except for heater ratings

=== AN ===
- AN1 – 300 mA_{avg}, 2 A_{peak}, 15 A_{surge}, Gas-filled triode thyratron with negative control characteristic. O5A European 5-pin base, for industrial control applications

=== AX ===
- AX1, 4652 – 500 V_{PIV}, 125 mA Gas-filled, full-wave rectifier, European 4-pin base
- AX50 – 500 V_{PIV}, 275 mA Gas-filled, full-wave rectifier, European 4-pin base

=== AZ ===
- AZ1 – 60 mA Full-wave power rectifier, side-contact 8 base
- AZ2 – 160 mA Full-wave power rectifier, side-contact 8 base
- AZ3 – 120 mA Full-wave power rectifier, side-contact 8 base
- AZ4 – 200 mA Full-wave power rectifier, side-contact 8 base
- AZ11 – Full-wave power rectifier, AZ1 with Y8A 8-pin steel tube base
- AZ12 – Full-wave power rectifier, AZ4 with Y8A 8-pin steel tube base
- AZ21 – 120 mA Full-wave power rectifier, Loctal base
- AZ31 – Full-wave power rectifier, AZ1 with 5-pin Octal base
- AZ32 – Full-wave power rectifier, AZ2 with 5-pin Octal base
- AZ33 – 120 mA Full-wave power rectifier, 4-pin Octal base
- AZ41 – 70 mA Full-wave power rectifier, Rimlock base
- AZ50 – 300 mA Full-wave power rectifier, European 4-pin base

== B - 180 mA heater ==
=== BB ===
- BB1 – Shielded common-cathode dual diode, CB2 with a 16 V heater and a European 5-pin base with one anode on top cap

=== BCH ===
- BCH1 – Triode-hexode mixer, German Hexode base, hexode control grid on top cap, ACH1 with a 24 V heater

=== BL ===
- BL2 – Power pentode, CL2 with a 30 V heater and a European 5-pin base with the control grid on top cap

== C - 200 mA heater ==
Note: Many "C" tubes had 13V/200mA heaters, so apart from 1930s European AC/DC radios, these were also used in 12-Volts car radios

=== CB ===
- CB1 – Dual diode, 5-pin side-contact base, 13 V heater, 1930s European radios.
- CB2 – Dual diode, 5-pin side-contact base, 13 V heater, 1930s European radios.

=== CBC ===
- CBC1 – Dual diode and triode, ABC1 with a 13 V heater, 1930s European radios.

=== CBL ===
- CBL1 – Dual diode and power pentode, 44 V heater, 1930s European radios.
- CBL6 – Dual diode and power pentode, 1930s European radios.
- CBL31 – Dual diode and power pentode, CBL1 with an Octal base, 1930s European radios.

=== CC ===
- CC2 – Triode, AC2 with a 13 V heater, 1930s European radios.

=== CCH ===
- CCH1 – Triode-hexode mixer, 1930s European radios.
- CCH2 – Triode-hexode mixer, 1930s European radios.
- CCH35 – Triode-hexode mixer, ECH3 with a different heater and base, 1930s European radios.

=== CF ===
- CF1 – Sharp-cutoff pentode, 13 V heater, 1930s European radios.
- CF2 – Remote-cutoff pentode, 13 V heater, 1930s European radios.
- CF3 – Remote-cutoff pentode, AF3 with a 13 V heater, 1930s European radios.
- CF7 – Sharp-cutoff pentode, AF7 with a 13 V heater, 1930s European radios.
- CF50 – Microphone preamplifier sharp-cutoff pentode
- CF51 – Microphone preamplifier sharp-cutoff pentode

=== CH ===
- CH1 – Hexode mixer, AH1 with a 13 V heater, 1930s European radios.

=== CK ===
- CK1 – Octode pentagrid converter, AK2 with a 13 V heater, 1930s European radios.
- CK3 – Octode pentagrid converter, EK3 with a different heater, 1930s European radios.

=== CL ===
- CL1 – Power pentode, 1930s European radios.
- CL2 – Power pentode, BL2 with a 24 V heater, 1930s European radios.
- CL4 – AF power pentode, 33 V heater, 1930s European radios.
- CL6 – Power pentode, 1930s European radios.
- CL33 – AF power pentode, CL4 with an octal base, 1930s European radios.

=== CM ===
- CM2 – Top-view, "Magic Eye"-type tuning indicator; has a 6.3 V/200 mA heater and was therefore marketed as C/EM2; identical to AM2 except for heater ratings

=== CY ===
- CY1 – 250 V, 80 mA Half wave rectifier, side-contact 8 base, 1930s European radios.
- CY2 – Separate-cathode dual 250 V, 60 mA rectifier, side-contact 8 base, for use as half wave rectifier or as voltage doubler. 1930s European radios.
- CY31 – CY1 with Octal base, 1930s European radios.
- CY32 – CY2 with Octal base, 1930s European radios.

== D - 1.4 V filament/heater ==
Note: D-type tubes except some rectifiers are directly heated.

=== DA ===
- DA50 – Subminiature diode, 3-pin all-glass wire-ended
- DA90 – Indirectly heated AM detector diode, miniature 7-pin base
- DA101 – Diode, miniature 7-pin base

=== DAC ===
- DAC21 – AM detector diode and AF triode
- DAC22 – AM detector diode and AF triode
- DAC25 – AM detector diode and AF triode
- DAC31 – AM detector diode and AF triode
- DAC32 – AM detector diode and AF triode
- DAC41w – AM detector diode and AF triode

=== DAF ===
- DAF11 – AM detector diode and AF pentode, wide-range heater
- DAF26 – AM detector diode and AF pentode
- DAF40 – AM detector diode and AF pentode
- DAF41 – AM detector diode and AF pentode
- DAF70 – Subminiature AM detector diode and AF pentode, all-glass wire-ended
- DAF91/1S5 – AM detector diode and AF pentode, miniature 7-pin base
- DAF92 – AM detector diode and AF pentode, miniature 7-pin base
- DAF96/1AH5 – AM detector diode and AF pentode, miniature 7-pin base
- DAF191 – AM detector diode and AF pentode, miniature 7-pin base
- DAF961 – AM detector diode and AF pentode, miniature 7-pin base

=== DAH ===
- DAH50 – Low voltage diode-heptode with a space charge grid

=== DBC ===
- DBC21 – Dual diode and Triode

=== DC ===
- DC11 – AF driver triode for DDD11, wide-range heater
- DC25 – AF driver triode for DDD25
- DC41w – Driver triode
- DC70/6375 – Subminiature UHF triode for walkie-talkies, all-glass wire-ended
- DC80/1E3 – Triode, oscillator/mixer/amplifier
- DC90 – Triode, FM receiver oscillator/mixer/amplifier, miniature 7-pin base
- DC96 – Triode, FM receiver oscillator/mixer/amplifier, miniature 7-pin base
- DC760 – Subminiature electrometer inverted triode for probes, all-glass wire-ended
- DC761 – Subminiature UHF triode, all-glass wire-ended
- DC762 – Subminiature electrometer inverted triode for probes, 100 fA grid current, all-glass wire-ended

—Special quality:

- D1C (957) – Acorn UHF triode
- D2C (958) – Acorn UHF triode

=== DCC ===
- DCC90 – Dual triode, RF amplifier or oscillator, miniature 7-pin base

=== DCF ===
- DCF60/1V6 – Triode and pentode, oscillator/mixer, all-glass 7-pin wire-ended

=== DCH ===
- DCH11 – Remote-cutoff triode/hexode mixer, wide-range heater
- DCH21 – Remote-cutoff triode/hexode mixer
- DCH25 – Remote-cutoff triode/hexode mixer
- DCH41w – Remote-cutoff triode/hexode mixer

=== DD ===
- DD960 – VHF power triode, miniature 7-pin base

=== DDD ===
- DDD11 – Dual AF power triode, wide-range heater – preferred driver is DC11
- DDD25 – Dual AF power triode – preferred driver is DC25
- DDD41w – Dual power triode

=== DF ===
- DF11 – Remote-cutoff RF/IF pentode, wide-range heater
- DF21 – Sharp-cutoff RF/IF/AF pentode
- DF22 – Remote-cutoff RF/IF pentode
- DF25 – Remote-cutoff RF/IF pentode
- DF26 – Sharp-cutoff RF/IF pentode
- DF33 – Remote-cutoff RF/IF pentode
- DF41w – Remote-cutoff RF/IF pentode
- DF60/5678 – Subminiature sharp-cutoff RF/IF/AF pentode, all-glass wire-ended
- DF61 – Subminiature sharp-cutoff RF or mixer pentode, all-glass wire-ended
- DF62/1AD4 – Subminiature sharp-cutoff RF pentode, all-glass wire-ended, for use as RF/IF stage
- DF63 – Subminiature remote-cutoff RF pentode, all-glass wire-ended, for use as RF/IF stage
- DF64 – Subminiature AF pentode, all-glass wire-ended, for use in hearing aids
- DF65 – Subminiature AF pentode, all-glass wire-ended, for use in hearing aids
- DF66 – Subminiature AF pentode, all-glass wire-ended, for use in hearing aids
- DF67/6008 – Subminiature AF pentode, all-glass wire-ended, for use in hearing aids
- DF70 – Subminiature AF pentode, all-glass wire-ended, for use in hearing aids
- DF72 – Subminiature sharp-cutoff RF pentode, all-glass wire-ended, for use as RF/IF stage
- DF73 – Subminiature remote-cutoff RF pentode, all-glass wire-ended, for use as RF/IF stage
- DF91/1T4 – Remote-cutoff RF/IF pentode, miniature 7-pin base
- DF92/1L4 – Sharp-cutoff RF/IF pentode, miniature 7-pin base
- DF96/1AJ4 – Remote-cutoff RF/IF pentode, miniature 7-pin base
- DF97/1AN5 – Remote-cutoff RF/IF pentode, miniature 7-pin base
- DF161 – Subminiature AF pentode, all-glass wire-ended, for use in hearing aids
- DF167 – Subminiature AF pentode, all-glass wire-ended, for use in hearing aids
- DF191 – RF pentode, miniature 7-pin base
- DF651 (CK549DX) – Subminiature AF pentode, all-glass wire-ended, for use in hearing aids
- DF668 – Subminiature RF pentode, all-glass wire-ended
- DF669 – Subminiature RF/IF pentode, all-glass wire-ended
- DF703 (5886) – Subminiature electrometer pentode, envelope has a moisture-repellent coating, all-glass wire-ended, for probe amplifiers
- DF904/1U4/5910 – Sharp-cutoff SW/VHF pentode, miniature 7-pin base
- DF906 – Sharp-cutoff SW/VHF pentode, miniature 7-pin base
- DF961 – Sharp-cutoff SW/VHF pentode, miniature 7-pin base

—Special quality:

- D1F – D11F with a hand grip
- D2F – D12F with a hand grip
- D3F (959) – Acorn VHF pentode
- D11F – Acorn remote-cutoff RF/IF/AF pentode for portable transceivers
- D12F – Acorn RF/IF/AF pentode for portable transceivers

=== DK ===
- DK21 – Octode beam pentagrid converter
- DK32/1A7 – Heptode pentagrid converter
- DK40 – Octode pentagrid converter
- DK91/1R5 – Heptode pentagrid converter, miniature 7-pin base
- DK92/1AC6 – Heptode pentagrid converter, miniature 7-pin base
- DK96/1AB6 – Heptode pentagrid converter, miniature 7-pin base
- DK192 – Heptode pentagrid converter, miniature 7-pin base
- DK962 – Heptode pentagrid converter, miniature 7-pin base

=== DL ===
- DL11 – 1 W AF Power pentode, wide-range heater
- DL21 – 700 mW AF Power pentode
- DL25 – Power pentode
- DL29/3D6 – Power pentode
- DL33/3Q5GT – 330 mW AF Power pentode
- DL35 – 400 mW Power pentode
- DL41 – 1.2 W Power pentode

- DL41w – Cup Power pentode

- DL64 – Subminiature AF power pentode, all-glass wire-ended, for use in hearing aids, V_{A} = 15 V, V_{Amax} = 45 V
- DL65 – Subminiature AF power pentode, all-glass wire-ended, for use in hearing aids, DL67/6007 with a different pinout, V_{A} = 22.5 V, V_{Amax} = 45 V
- DL66 – Subminiature AF power pentode, all-glass wire-ended, for use in hearing aids, V_{A} = 22.5 V, V_{Amax} = 45 V
- DL67/6007 – Subminiature AF power pentode, all-glass wire-ended, for use in hearing aids, DL65 with a different pinout, V_{A} = 22.5 V, V_{Amax} = 45 V
- DL68 – Subminiature AF power pentode, all-glass wire-ended, for use in hearing aids, V_{A} = 22.5 V, V_{Amax} = 45 V
- DL69 – Subminiature power pentode, all-glass wire-ended, V_{A} = 90 V
- DL70 – Subminiature VHF power pentode up to 200 MHz, all-glass wire-ended, for use in walkie-talkies, V_{A} = 150 V
- DL71 – Subminiature AF power pentode, all-glass wire-ended, for use in hearing aids, V_{A} = 22.5 V, V_{Amax} = 45 V
- DL72 – Subminiature AF power pentode, all-glass wire-ended, for use in hearing aids, V_{Amax} = 45 V
- DL73 (CV2299) – Subminiature VHF power pentode up to 200 MHz, all-glass wire-ended, for use in walkie-talkies, V_{A} = 150 V
- DL91/1S4 – 700 mW AF Power pentode, miniature 7-pin base
- DL92/3S4 – 700 mW AF Power pentode, miniature 7-pin base
- DL93/3A4 – 2 W RF/AF Power pentode, miniature 7-pin base
- DL94/3V4 – 1.2 W AF Power pentode, miniature 7-pin base
- DL95/3Q4 – DL94/3V4 with a different pinout
- DL96/3C4 – 600 mW AF Power pentode, miniature 7-pin base
- DL98/3B4 – 3 W VHF power pentode up to 100 MHz, miniature 7-pin base
- DL161 – Subminiature AF power pentode, all-glass wire-ended, for use in hearing aids
- DL167 – 25 mW Subminiature AF power pentode, all-glass wire-ended, for use in hearing aids
- DL192 – 850 mW AF Power pentode, miniature 7-pin base
- DL193 – 1.5 W AF Power pentode, miniature 7-pin base
- DL620 – 110 mW Subminiature power pentode, all-glass wire-ended, V_{Amax} = 90 V
- DL907 – SW/VHF power pentode, miniature 7-pin base
- DL962 – DL192 with a different filament
- DL963 – DL193 with a different filament

=== DLL ===
- DLL21 – 1.5 W AF Dual power pentode
- DLL101 – Dual power pentode, miniature 7-pin base
- DLL102 – Dual power pentode, miniature 7-pin base

=== DM ===
- DM21 – Top-view, "Magic Eye"-type tuning indicator
- DM70/1M3 – Side-view, subminiature band-and-dot-type tuning/level indicator, all-glass wire-ended
- DM71/1N3 – Side-view, subminiature band-and-dot-type tuning/level indicator, all-glass wire-ended
- DM160/6977 (ИВ-15) – First vacuum fluorescent display, single segment, side-view, for use as flip-flop status indicator in transistorized computers. All-glass wire-ended

=== DY ===
- DY30 – 30 kV CRT EHT rectifier
- DY51 – Half-indirectly heated 15 kV portable-TV CRT EHT rectifier, filament internally connected to cathode, all-glass, filament wire-ends on one end, anode wire-end on the other
- DY70 – 10 kV CRT EHT rectifier, 3-pin all-glass wire-ended, anode on top wire
- DY80 – 23 kV CRT EHT rectifier, noval base
- DY86/1S2 – Half-indirectly heated 18 kV CRT EHT rectifier, noval base, filament internally connected to cathode. Identical to EY86 except for heater ratings
- DY87/1S2A – DY86/1S2 with chemically treated envelope to avoid flush-over in high-humidity and low atmospheric-pressure conditions. Identical to EY87 except for heater ratings
- DY802 – Half-indirectly heated 20 kV CRT EHT rectifier, noval base, filament internally connected to cathode. Identical to EY802 except for heater ratings
- DY900 – Half-indirectly heated 16 kV CRT EHT rectifier, miniature 7-pin base, filament internally connected to cathode

== E - 6.3 V heater ==
=== EA ===
- EA40 – 7 kV, 25 mA Diode, 4-pin Rimlock base
- EA50/2B35 – Diode for TV detectors, 3+1-pin all-glass subminiature with anode on top pin
- EA52/6923 – Instrumentation rectifier diode up to 1 GHz, Rocket-type disk-seal tube
- EA53 – Co-axial instrumentation rectifier diode up to 1 GHz, Rocket-type disk-seal tube
- EA76 – Diode, 5-pin all-glass wire-ended
- EA111 – Diode for time bases, Y8A 8-pin steel tube base
- EA766 – Diode, 5-pin all-glass wire-ended
- EA960 – 100 V_{PIV} VHF Diode, miniature 7-pin base
- EA961 – 2 kV_{PIV} VHF Diode, miniature 7-pin base
- EA962 – 100 V_{PIV} VHF Diode with extremely small distance between cathode and anode for extended frequency range, miniature 7-pin base

=== EAA ===
- EAA11 – Dual diode, Y8A 8-pin steel tube base
- EAA91/6AL5 – Dual diode with separate cathodes, miniature 7-pin base, identical to HAA91/12AL5, UAA91 and XAA91/3AL5 except for heater ratings, EB91 with a shorter envelope
- EAA171 – Dual diode, separate cathodes, gnome tube

—Special quality:

- E91AA/EAA901S/5726 – Dual RF diode, miniature 7-pin base

=== EAB ===
- EAB1 – Triple diode with common cathode

=== EABC ===
- EABC80/6AK8 – High-mu triode, triple low-voltage diode (two on common cathode with triode, one with independent cathode). Noval base, used as an AF amplifier, AM detector and ratio detector in AC-powered post-war European AM/FM radios. Electronically identical to American types 6AK8 (usually marked 6AK8/EABC80), 6T8, and 6T8A; also DH719. Identical to 5T8, 6T8, HABC80/19T8, PABC80/9AK8 and UABC80/27AK8 except for heater ratings

=== EAC ===
- EAC91 – Diode/triode UHF mixer

=== EAF ===
- EAF21 – Diode - pentode, UAF21 with a different heater
- EAF41 – Diode - remote-cutoff RF/IF/AF pentode, Rimlock base, UAF41 with a different heater
- EAF42/6CT7 – Diode - remote-cutoff RF/IF/AF pentode, Rimlock base
- EAF801 – Diode - remote-cutoff pentode, Noval base

=== EAM ===
- EAM86/6GX8 – Diode - side-view, band-type tuning/level indicator

=== EB ===
- EB1 – Low-power dual diode
- EB2 – Low-power dual diode
- EB4 – Low-power dual diode, EB11 or EB34 with a side-contact 8 base
- EB11 – Low-power dual diode, EB4 or EB34 with a Y8A 8-pin steel tube base
- EB34 – Low-power dual diode, EB4 or EB11 with an Octal base
- EB40 – Low-power dual diode
- EB41 – Low-power dual diode
- EB91 – Dual diode with separate cathodes, miniature 7-pin base, for FM ratio detectors, EAA91/6AL5 with a longer envelope

=== EBC ===
- EBC1 – Low-power dual diode and triode, ABC1 with a different heater
- EBC3 – Low-power dual diode and triode
- EBC11 – Low-power dual diode and triode
- EBC33 – Low-power dual diode and triode, EBC3 with an Octal base
- EBC41 – Low-power dual diode and triode, EBC81/6BD7A with a Rimlock base
- EBC81/6BD7A – Low-power dual diode and triode, EBC41 with a Noval base
- EBC90/6AT6 – High-mu triode and common cathode dual diode, miniature 7-pin base, HBC90/12AT6 with a different heater
- EBC91/6AV6 – High-mu AF triode and common cathode dual diode, for use in FM ratio detectors, miniature 7-pin base, HBC91/12AV6 with a different heater

=== EBF ===
- EBF2 – Common-cathode dual diode and remote-cutoff RF/IF/AF pentode, EBF11 or EBF35 with a side-contact 8 base
- EBF11 – Common-cathode dual diode and RF/IF/AF pentode, EBF2 or EBF35 with a Y8A 8-pin steel tube base, VBF11 with different heater ratings
- EBF15 – Dual diode and pentode, UBF15 with a different heater
- EBF32 – Common-cathode dual diode and remote-cutoff RF/IF pentode, Octal base with g1 on cap
- EBF35 – Common-cathode dual diode and remote-cutoff RF/IF pentode, identical to EBF2 and EBF11 except for Octal base with g1 on cap
- EBF80/6N8 (WD709) – Common-cathode dual diode and remote-cutoff pentode, noval base
- EBF83/6DR8 – Common-cathode dual diode and pentode, anode voltage 6 to 50 V, for use as IF amplifier, detector and AGC diode in vehicle equipment, noval base
- EBF89/6DC8/7125 – Common-cathode dual diode and RF/IF pentode, noval base
- EBF171 – Dual Diode and remote-cutoff RF/IF/AF pentode; the first gnome tube, a modified and repackaged EBF11

=== EBL ===
- EBL1 – Dual diode and power pentode, identical to EBL21 and EBL31 except for side-contact 8 base, and heater ratings
- EBL21 – Dual diode and power pentode, identical to EBL1 and EBL31 except for B8G Loctal base, and heater ratings
- EBL31 – Dual diode and power pentode, identical to EBL1 and EBL21 except for Octal base, and heater ratings
- EBL71 – Dual diode and power pentode

=== EC ===
- EC2 – Triode for use as AF amplifier or as oscillator, side-contact 8 base, AC2 with a different heater
- EC40 – VHF Triode up to 500 MHz, EC80 with a Rimlock base
- EC41 – UHF oscillator triode, EC81 with a Rimlock base
- EC50 – Helium-filled triode thyratron for use as a horizontal sweep, sawtooth waveform generator in oscilloscopes
- EC52 – RF triode for use as an oscillator, B9G 9-pin Loctal base
- EC53 – VHF triode for use as an oscillator up to 600 MHz
- EC55/5861 (R243) – 3 GHz, 10 W Disk-seal UHF triode
- EC56 – 4 GHz Disk-seal microwave triode
- EC57 (EC157) – Disk-seal microwave triode
- EC70/6778 – Subminiature UHF triode for use as an oscillator in the 500 MHz range, 8-pin all-glass wire-ended
- EC71/5718 – Subminiature UHF triode up to 1 GHz, for use as an oscillator in the 500 MHz range, 8-pin all-glass wire-ended
- EC80/6Q4 – VHF Triode up to 500 MHz
- EC81/6R4 – UHF oscillator triode
- EC84/6AJ4 – High-mu triode
- EC86/6CM4 – UHF triode, PC86/4CM4 with a different heater
- EC88/6DL4 – UHF triode, PC88/4DL4 with a different heater. This and the EC86 were often encountered in UHF TV tuners, the latter as a self oscillating mixer
- EC90/6C4 – 3.6 W Small-power VHF triode up to 150 MHz; single ECC82/12AU7 system
- EC91/6AQ4 – VHF triode up to 250 MHz
- EC92/6AB4 – VHF triode for FM receiver frontends, single ECC81/12AT7 system, UC92/9AB4 with a different heater
- EC94/6AF4 – UHF mixer/oscillator triode
- EC95 – VHF triode with variable mutual conductance, PC95 with a different heater
- EC97/6FY5 – Frame-grid VHF triode, identical to PC97/4FY5 and XC97 except for heater ratings
- EC98 – UHF triode
- EC157/8108 – 4 GHz, 12.5 W Disk-seal microwave triode
- EC158 – Low-voltage, 4 GHz, 30 W disk-seal microwave triode
- EC760 (5718) – Subminiature VHF mixer/oscillator triode up to 500 MHz, 7-pin all-glass wire-ended
- EC860 – 20 mA_{avg}, 500 mA_{pk} Helium-filled grid-turn-off triode thyratron e.g. for relaxation oscillators up to 150 kHz, noval base
- EC900 – VHF triode, PC900 with a different heater

—Special quality:

- EC1000 – Triode for use as amplifier in probes
- EC1030 – Indirectly heated UHF triode, hot-standby (no cathode current) resistant, all-glass wire-ended with 8 tinned, 38 mm long wires
- EC1031 – EC1030 with 5.5 mm long, gold-plated pins for insertion into a special socket
- EC8010 – UHF triode for use as amplifier or oscillator up to 1 GHz
- EC8020 – UHF triode
- E1C, 4671 (955) – Acorn UHF triode
- E20C – RF triode for wide band cascode circuits, B8G Loctal base
- E86C (EC806S) – UHF triode up to 800 MHz, gold-plated pins
- E88C/8255 – UHF triode for grounded-grid amplifiers, up to 1 GHz

=== ECC ===
- ECC32/6SN7 – Separate cathodes dual AF triode, octal base
- ECC33 – Separate cathodes, high-mu dual triode for use as a flip-flop, octal base
- ECC34 – Separate cathodes, dual triode for use as a CRT vertical-deflection power multivibrator, octal base
- ECC35/6SL7 – Separate cathodes, high-mu AF dual triode, octal base
- ECC40 – Separate cathodes, AF dual triode, Rimlock base
- ECC70/6021 – Separate cathodes, subminiature VHF medium-mu dual triode, 8-pin all-glass wire-ended
- ECC81/12AT7
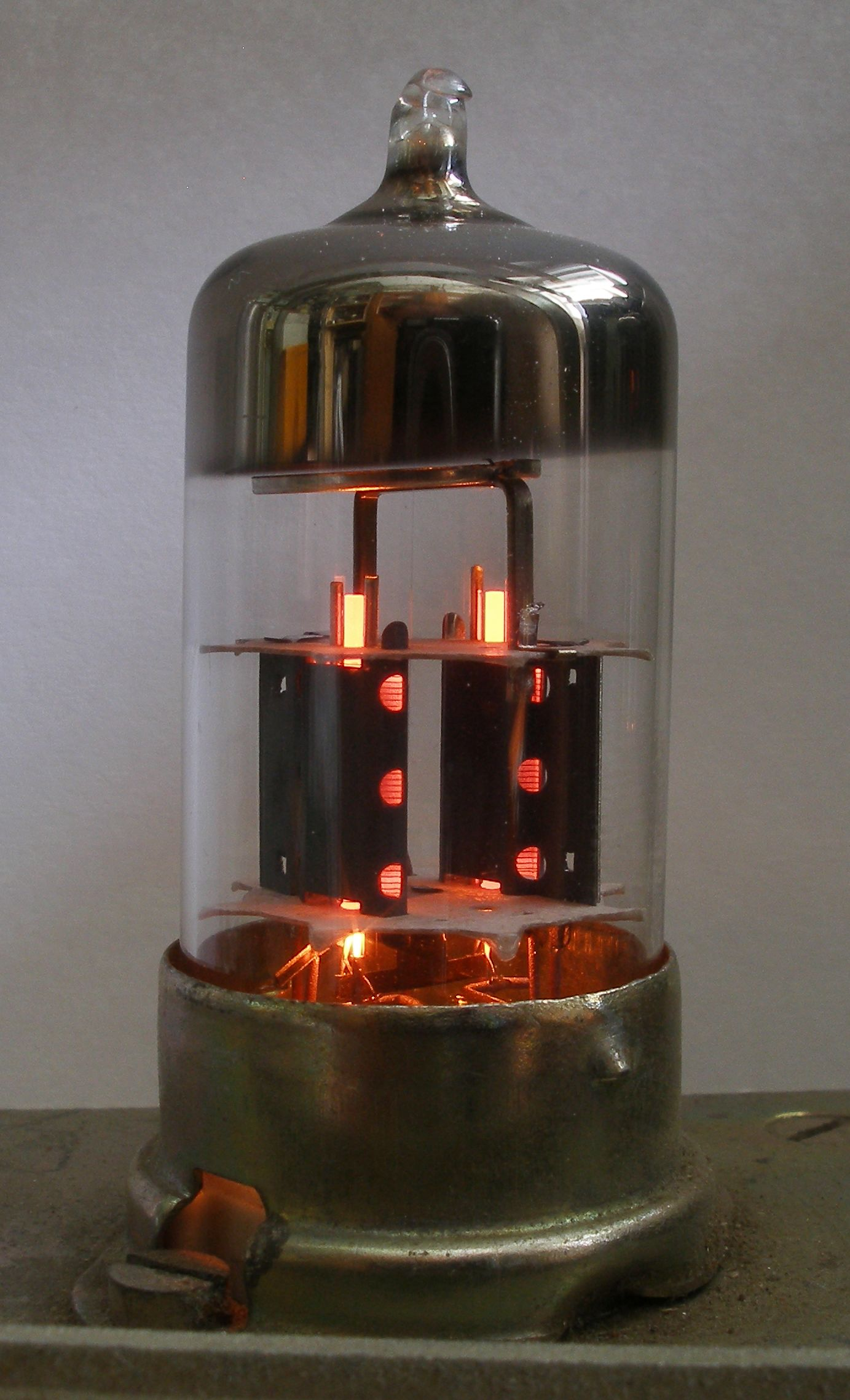
  ECC83/12AX7
  (6060, M8162, B309) – High-mu dual triode, for use as RF amplifier/mixer in VHF circuits, noval base. Two EC92/6AB4s in one envelope, the ECC81 being specified with the same frequency characteristics as the EC92.
- ECC82/12AU7 (6067, M8136, B329) – Medium-mu dual triode for use as AF amplifier, noval base, identical to XCC82 except for heater ratings. Two EC90/6C4s in one envelope; however, the ECC82 is only specified as an audio frequency device.
- ECC83/12AX7 (6057, M8137, B339) – High-mu dual triode for use as a high-gain AF amplifier, noval base
- ECC84/6CW7 – Dual VHF triode for grounded-grid/cascode amplifiers in TV tuners; section 1 cathode is connected to two adjacent pins and the screen between the two sections is internally connected to the section 2 grid; noval base. Identical to PCC84/7AN7 and UCC84 except for heater ratings
- ECC85/6AQ8 – Dual triode for use as VHF oscillator/mixer up to 200 MHz, noval base, identical to HCC85/17EW8, PCC85/9AQ8 and UCC85 except for heater ratings
- ECC86/6GM8 – Dual low (6.3-25 V) anode voltage triode, noval base, for use in VHF tuners in vehicle equipment
- ECC87 (E80CC/6085) – ECC40 with a Noval base, allowing for a heater center-tap
- ECC88/6DJ8 – Dual triode used as cascode RF amplifier in TV tuners and VHF receiver front ends, or as general-purpose instrumentation dual triode, noval base, PCC88/7DJ8 with a different heater
- ECC89/6FC7 – Dual Triode used as cascode RF amplifier in TV tuners and VHF receiver front ends, or as general-purpose instrumentation dual triode, noval base

Notes:
- All ECC8x have separate cathodes
- ECC81, 82 & 83 have the individual triode heaters internally series-connected, with the midpoint on a separate pin, so they could be run on both 6.3 V and 12.6 V (hence RETMA lists them as 12V types), which was useful in dual-system (6V and 12V) car radios
- All other ECC8x have no heater midpoint tap; ECC85, 86 & 88 have the freed-up pin being used for an internal screen between the sections

- ECC91/6J6 – Common cathode dual VHF triode, miniature 7-pin base
- ECC92 – Common cathode dual triode for use as a flip-flop in computers, miniature 7-pin base
- ECC99 – Separate cathodes dual RF triode, noval base
- ECC171 – Separate cathodes and separate heaters dual triode, 11-pin gnome tube with internal shield
- ECC180/6BQ7A – Separate cathodes, dual VHF triode for cascode amplifiers
- ECC186/7316 – Separate cathodes, dual triode for use in digital computers, withstands zero cathode current for extended periods of time
- ECC189/6ES8 – Separate cathodes, dual variable-mu VHF triode for cascode amplifiers; identical to PCC189/7ES8, XCC189/4ES8 and YCC189/5ES8 except for heater ratings
- ECC230/6AS7G/6080 – Separate cathodes, dual low-mu power triode for use as series regulator in DC power supplies, servo applications, or as a horizontal booster triode in TV monitors, Octal base
- ECC802 – Separate cathodes, dual AF triode
- ECC803 – Separate cathodes, dual low-microphonics AF triode
- ECC807 – Separate cathodes, dual AF triode for high-gain preamplifiers
- ECC808/6KX8 – Separate cathodes, dual AF triode for use as record head output tube in tape recorders
- ECC812 – Separate cathodes, dual shielded triode for color TV chrominance outputs in SECAM TV receivers
- ECC832/12DW7/7247 – Dual AF triode, a combination of one ECC83/12AX7 system for use as a high-gain amplifier and one ECC82/12AU7 system for use as a phase inverter or cathode follower
- ECC960 – Common cathode, dual triode for use as a flip-flop in computers

—Special quality:

- ECC2000 – VHF separate cathodes, dual triode with neutralization screen, for use in cascode amplifiers up to 300 MHz, 10-pin Decal base
- ECC8100 – VHF separate cathodes, dual triode with neutralization screen ("Neutrode") connected to the heater, for use in cascode amplifiers, noval base
- E80CC/6085 – Separate cathodes, dual triode for use as DC or AF amplifier
- E81CC/ECC801S/6201 – Separate cathodes, dual triode for AF and RF amplifiers, mixers up to 300 MHz, oscillators, impulse circuits; withstands zero cathode current for extended periods of time
- E82CC/ECC802S/6189 – Separate cathodes, dual triode for use as amplifier or multivibrator
- E83CC/6681 (ECC803S/6057) – Separate cathodes, low-microphonics dual triode
- E88CC/6922 – Separate cathodes, dual triode, gold-plated pins
- E90CC/5920 – Common cathode, dual triode for use as a flip-flop in computers
- E92CC – Common cathode, dual triode for use as a flip-flop in computers
- E180CC/7062 – (5965) Separate cathodes, dual triode for use as a flip-flop in computers
- E181CC – Separate cathodes, dual triode for use in digital computers, withstands zero cathode current for extended periods of time
- E182CC/7119 – Separate cathodes, dual triode for use as a flip-flop in computers
- E188CC/7308 – Separate cathodes, dual triode for use as RF/IF/AF amplifier
- E283CC – Separate cathodes, dual triode for use as AF or instrumentation amplifier
- E288CC/8223 – Separate cathodes, dual triode for use in IF, RF and cascode amplifiers

=== ECF ===
- ECF1 – Triode - Pentode
- ECF12 – Triode - Pentode
- ECF80/6BL8 – VHF mixer/oscillator triode/pentode, identical to LCF80/6LN8, PCF80/9A8, UCF80 and XCF80/4BL8 except for heater ratings
- ECF82/6U8 – Triode - Pentode. Identical to PCF82/9U8A and XCF82 except for heater ratings
- ECF83 – Triode - remote-cutoff pentode, low microphonics, for vehicle equipment
- ECF86/6HG8 – VHF mixer/oscillator triode/pentode, identical to LCF86/5HG8, PCF86/7HG8, 8HG8 and XCF86/4HG8 except for heater ratings
- ECF174 – Triode and pentode, gnome tube
- ECF200/6X9 – Triode and pentode for use as IF amplifier in TV receivers, decal base, PCF200 with a different heater
- ECF201/6U9 – Triode and pentode for use as IF amplifier and sync sep in TV receivers, decal base, identical to LCF201/5U9 and PCF201 except for heater ratings
- ECF202 – Triode and pentode for use as SECAM chroma signal demodulators in analog color TV receivers, decal base
- ECF801/6GJ7 – Triode and pentode for use as VHF mixer in TV receivers, noval base, identical to LCF801/5GJ7, PCF801/8GJ7 and XCF801/4GJ7 except for heater ratings
- ECF802/6JW8 – Triode and pentode for use as reactance and sinewave oscillator in TV receivers, noval base, identical to LCF802/6LX8, PCF802/9JW8 and 5JW8 except for heater ratings
- ECF804 – Triode and pentode for use as wide band amplifier, noval base, PCF804 with a different heater
- ECF805 – Triode and pentode, noval base, PCF805/7GV7 with a different heater
- ECF812 = 6FL2 – Triode and beam tetrode, noval base, PCF812 (=30FL2) with a different heater

—Special quality:

- ECF8070 – Triode - Pentode
- E80CF/7643 – Triode - pentode

=== ECH ===
- ECH3 – Triode/hexode oscillator/mixer, ECH33 with a side-contact 8 base
- ECH4 – Triode/heptode oscillator/mixer, ECH21 with a side-contact 8 base
- ECH11 – Triode/hexode oscillator/mixer, VCH11 with a different heater
- ECH21 (X143) – Triode/heptode oscillator/mixer, ECH4 with a B8G Loctal base
- ECH33 – Triode/hexode oscillator/mixer, ECH3 with an Octal base
- ECH35 (X147) – Triode/hexode oscillator/mixer
- ECH41 – Triode/hexode oscillator/mixer
- ECH42/6CU7 – Triode/hexode oscillator/mixer, UCH42 with a different heater
- ECH43 – Triode/hexode oscillator/mixer, low-microphonics version of ECH42; UCH43 with a different heater
- ECH71 – Triode/heptode oscillator/mixer
- ECH80/6AN7 – Triode-hexode oscillator/mixer
- ECH81/6AJ8 (X719) – Triode/heptode oscillator/mixer, XCH81 with a different heater
- ECH83/6DS8 – Low (6.3-25 V) anode voltage, Triode/heptode oscillator/mixer, for use in vehicle equipment
- ECH84 – Triode/heptode oscillator/mixer
- ECH171 – Triode/remote-cutoff heptode Mixer, gnome tube
- ECH200 – Triode/heptode, for TV sync sep, PCH200 with a different heater

—Special quality:

- ECH8000 – Triode/remote-cutoff heptode oscillator/mixer

=== ECL ===
- ECL11 – Triode - power tetrode
- ECL80/6AB8 – Triode - power pentode
- ECL81 – Triode - power pentode. Identical to PCL81 except for heater ratings
- ECL82/6BM8 – AF triode - AF power pentode, identical to PCL82/16A8, UCL82/50BM8 and XCL82 except for heater ratings
- ECL83 – Triode - power pentode, PCL83 with a different heater
- ECL84/6DX8 – TV sync sep triode - CRT cathode drive power pentode, identical to LCL84/10DX8, PCL84/15DQ8 and XCL84/8DX8 except for heater ratings
- ECL85/6GV8 – Triode - power pentode used in TV receivers for vertical timebase, generally as a multivibrator, with the pentode section doubling as one half of the multivibrator and the power output device, identical to LCL85/10GV8, PCL85/18GV8 and XCL85/9GV8 except for heater ratings
- ECL86/6GW8 – AF Triode - AF power pentode, used for audio amplification in European TV receivers, PCL86/14GW8 with a different heater
- ECL113 – Triode - AF power pentode, Rimlock base
- ECL200 – Triode - CRT drive power pentode, decal base, PCL200 with a different heater
- ECL802 – Triode - Power pentode for use as vertical oscillator and output tube in TV receivers
- ECL805 – Triode - Power pentode with separate cathodes, PCL805 with a different heater

=== ECLL ===
- ECLL800 – Triode and dual screened power pentode, for 9.2 W (Class-B) or 8.5 W (Class-AB) AF push-pull power amplifiers. The triode shares its control grid with the 1st pentode and acts as a phase inverter for the 2nd pentode; both pentodes share screen and suppressor grids; noval base

=== ED ===
- ED111 – 6 W VHF power triode up to 85 MHz
- ED500 – Identical to PD500 except for heater ratings
- ED501 – 27 kV Color CRT EHT shunt stabilizer triode

—Special quality:

- ED8000 – Power triode for use in series-pass voltage regulators

=== EDD ===
- EDD11 – Dual power triode
- EDD171 – Dual high-mu power triode, gnome tube

=== EE ===
- EE58L - RF Output Triode, used at ATC transponders (used in Collins TDR-90 transponder).
- EE1 (EEP1, 4696) – Single-ended secondary emission amplifier for use as a wide band amplifier and phase inverter
- EE50 – Single-ended secondary emission amplifier for use in TV receivers, B9G 9-pin Loctal base

=== EEL ===
- EEL71 – AF Tetrode - AF power pentode, B8G Loctal base, for use as audion detector, AF preamplifier, AF power amplifier
- EEL171 – Remote-cutoff tetrode and 4-Watt power pentode, gnome tube

=== EEP ===
- EEP1 See EE1

=== EF ===
- EF1 – RF/IF Pentode
- EF2 – Remote-cutoff RF/IF pentode
- EF3 – Remote-cutoff RF/IF pentode
- EF5 – Remote-cutoff pentode
- EF6 – AF Pentode, EF36 with a side-contact 8 base
- EF7 – RF/IF Pentode
- EF8 – Selektode, a remote-cutoff pentode with a beam-forming extra grid between control and screen grids, intended to reduce screen current and hence anode/screen grid distribution noise (technically a hexode), EF38 with a side-contact 8 base
- EF9 – Pentode, EF22/7B7, EF39/6K7 or EF41/6CJ5 with a side-contact 8 base with control grid on top cap
- EF11 – Remote-cutoff pentode, Y8A 8-pin steel tube base
- EF12 – Pentode, Y8A 8-pin steel tube base
- EF13 – Remote-cutoff pentode
- EF14 – Sharp-cutoff pentode, Y8A 8-pin steel tube base, identical to UF14 and VF14 except for heater ratings
- EF15 – Remote-cutoff pentode, UF15 with a different heater
- EF22 – Pentode, EF9, EF39/6K7 and EF41/6CJ5 with a B8G Loctal base
- EF27 – Pentode
- EF36 – Pentode, EF6 with an Octal base
- EF37/6J7 – Sharp-cutoff pentode for use as a tuned RF amplifier, a (second) detector, or an AF amplifier; octal base with control grid on top-cap
- EF38 – EF8 with an Octal base
- EF39/6K7 – Remote-cutoff RF pentode for use as an IF amplifier or as a superheterodyne mixer (1st detector). Also used in test equipment. EF4, EF22 and EF41/6CJ5 with an Octal base with control grid on top-cap
- EF40 – AF Pentode
- EF41/6CJ5 (62VP) – Remote-cutoff pentode, EF4, EF22/7B7 or EF39/6K7 with a Rimlock base
- EF42 – Pentode, EF52 with a Rimlock base
- EF43 – Remote-cutoff pentode
- EF50 (EF53) – Remote-cutoff pentode for use in the IF stages of 1940s TV and radar receivers, B9G 9-pin Loctal base
- EF51 – Remote-cutoff pentode
- EF52 – Pentode, EF42 with a B8G Loctal base
- EF54 – Pentode, B9G 9-pin Loctal base
- EF55 – Pentode, B9G 9-pin Loctal base
- EF70 – Subminiature pentode, suppressor grid available on separate wire-end and internally connected to a separate diode to prevent positive grid voltage, for use as a NAND gate in coincidence circuits; all-glass 8-pin wire-ended
- EF71/5899 – Subminiature remote-cutoff pentode, all-glass 8-pin wire-ended
- EF72 – Subminiature sharp-cutoff RF pentode, all-glass 8-pin wire-ended
- EF73 – Subminiature AF pentode, all-glass 8-pin wire-ended
- EF74 – Subminiature, low-microphonics pentode, all-glass 8-pin wire-ended
- EF80/6BX6 (Z152) – Sharp-cutoff RF/IF/Video pentode, noval base
- EF83 – Remote-cutoff AF pentode, Noval base
- EF85/6BY7 (W719) – Remote-cutoff wideband RF pentode, noval base, identical to HF85 and XF85 except for heater ratings

- EF86/6BK8 (6267, Z729) – AF Pentode. Identical to PF86 and UF86 except for heater ratings, Noval base
- EF89/6DA6 – Remote-cutoff VHF pentode, Noval base
- EF91/6AM6 (6064, Z77, M8083, 8D3) – Sharp-cutoff pentode, Miniature 7-pin base
- EF92/6CQ6 (M8161) – Remote-cutoff RF pentode, Miniature 7-pin base
- EF93/6BA6 (W727) – Remote-cutoff RF pentode, miniature 7-pin base, HF93/12BA6 with a different heater
- EF94/6AU6 – Sharp-cutoff RF/IF/AF pentode, miniature 7-pin base, identical to HF94/12AU6 and XF94/3AU6 except for heater ratings
- EF95/6AK5 (5654, 408A, 6J1P (6Ж1П), CV4010) – RF Pentode, Miniature 7-pin base
- EF96/6AG5 – Pentode, Miniature 7-pin base
- EF97/6ES6 – Low (6.3-50 V) anode voltage, remote-cutoff RF/IF pentode, for use in vehicle equipment, Miniature 7-pin base
- EF98/6ET6 – Low (6.3-50 V) anode voltage, sharp-cutoff pentode, for use as oscillator or IF/AF amplifier in vehicle equipment, Miniature 7-pin base
- EF111 – Remote-cutoff pentode, Y8A 8-pin steel tube base
- EF112 – Pentode, Y8A 8-pin steel tube base
- EF172 – RF/IF/AF Pentode, gnome tube
- EF174 – Pentode, gnome tube
- EF175 – Remote-cutoff RF/IF pentode, gnome tube
- EF176 – VHF Pentode, gnome tube
- EF177 – VHF Pentode, gnome tube
- EF183/6EH7 – Frame grid, remote-cutoff IF pentode for use in TV receivers, identical to LF183/YF183/4EH7 and XF183/3EH7 except for heater ratings
- EF184/6EJ7 – Frame-grid, sharp-cutoff IF pentode for use in TV receivers, identical to LF184/YF184/4EJ7 and XF184/3EJ7 except for heater ratings
- EF410 – RF/IF Pentode, Rimlock base
- EF730/5636 – Subminiature dual-control, sharp-cutoff RF/IF pentode for use as a gated or gain-controlled amplifier, 8-pin all-glass wire-ended, similar to 5784
- EF731 – Subminiature remote-cutoff RF pentode, 8-pin all-glass wire-ended
- EF732 – Subminiature sharp-cutoff RF pentode, 8-pin all-glass wire-ended
- EF734 – Subminiature sharp-cutoff RF pentode, 8-pin all-glass wire-ended
- EF762 – Subminiature sharp-cutoff RF/IF pentode, 8-pin all-glass wire-ended
- EF800 – Long-life sharp-cutoff RF/IF pentode
- EF802 – Long-life RF/IF pentode
- EF804 – AF low-hum, low-microphonics pentode
- EF816 – Dual-anode pentode for TV receiver sync separation service
- EF860 – Long-life sharp-cutoff RF pentode for use as preamplifier in telecomms wide-area receivers. Identical to IF860 except for heater ratings (300mA)

—Special quality:

- EF804S – Ruggedized, long-life version of EF804
- EF805S – Long-life remote-cutoff RF/IF pentode
- EF806S – Ruggedized, long-life AF pentode
- EF5000 – secondary emission wide band pentode, noval base
- EF8010 – Remote-cutoff RF/IF pentode
- E1F (954, 4672) – Acorn UHF pentode
- E2F (956, 4695) – Acorn UHF pentode
- E3F – E13F with a hand grip
- E13F – Acorn remote-cutoff RF/IF/AF signal/power pentode for portable transceivers
- E80F/6084 – AF pentode, gold-plated pins
- E83F/6689 – Long-life, wide band pentode for use in telephone equipment, gold-plated pins
- E90F/6BH6/7693 – RF Pentode
- E95F/6AK5W/5654 – Pentode
- E99F/6BJ6/7694 – Remote-cutoff RF pentode
- E180F/6688 – Wide band pentode, wideband amplifier for professional equipment
- E186F/7737 – Wide band pentode, wideband amplifier
- E280F/7722 – Wide band pentode, wideband amplifier
- E282F – Pentode, wideband amplifier up to 250 MHz
- E810F/7788 – Wide band pentode, gold-plated pins

=== EFF ===
- EFF51 – Dual VHF pentode up to 500 MHz, B9G 9-pin Loctal base

=== EFL ===
- EFL200/6Y9 – Sync sep pentode and CRT cathode drive power pentode, decal base; identical to LFL200/11Y9 and PFL200/16Y9 except for heater ratings

=== EFM ===
- EFM1 – Variable-mu AF pentode - top-view, "Magic Eye"-type tuning indicator
- EFM11 – Variable-mu AF pentode - top-view, "Magic Eye"-type tuning indicator

=== EFP ===
- EFP60 – Secondary emission pentode for TV amplifiers, B9G 9-pin Loctal base

=== EH ===
- EH1 – Remote-cutoff hexode mixer, separate oscillator
- EH2 – Remote-cutoff heptode mixer, separate oscillator
- EH81 (E81H) – Sharp-cutoff heptode used as FM quadrature demodulator
- EH90/6CS6 – Sharp-cutoff heptode for use in TV receivers
- EH171 – Sharp-cutoff heptode, gnome tube
- EH860 – Sharp-cutoff heptode

—Special quality:

- EH900S/5915 – Sharp-cutoff switching heptode, designed for high speed digital computers
- E91H/6687 – Sharp-cutoff heptode for use as a NAND gate in a coincidence circuit

=== EK ===
- EK1 – Octode pentagrid converter
- EK2 – Octode pentagrid converter, similar to AK2, EK32 with a side-contact 8 base
- EK3 – Beam octode pentagrid converter, CK3 with a different heater, similar to AK2, side-contact 8 base
- EK32 – Octode pentagrid converter, EK2 with octal base and top cap
- EK90/6BE6 – Heptode pentagrid converter

=== EL ===
- EL1 – Power Pentode
- EL2 – Power pentode, EL32 with a side-contact 8 base with control grid on top cap
- EL3 – Power pentode, EL11 or EL33 with a side-contact 8 base

- EL3G (6V6) – EL3 with an Octal base

- EL5 – Power pentode, identical to AL5 except for heater ratings and to EL35 except for side-contact 8 base
- EL6 – Power pentode, EL12 with a side-contact 8 base
- EL8 – Power pentode, EL13 with a side-contact 8 base
- EL11 – Power pentode, EL3(N) or EL33 with a Y8A 8-pin steel tube base
- EL12 – Power pentode, EL6 with a Y8A 8-pin steel tube base
- EL13 – Power pentode, EL8 with a Y8A 8-pin steel tube base
- EL32 – Power pentode, EL2 with an Octal base
- EL33 (6M6G) – Power pentode, EL3 or EL11 with an Octal base
- EL34/6CA7 – Power pentode
- EL35 – Power pentode, EL5 with an Octal base
- EL36/6CM5 – Audio or CRT horizontal deflection output power pentode, identical to EL12 except for Octal base and to XL36/13CM5 except for heater ratings
- EL37/6L6 – Power pentode
- EL38/6CN6 – Power pentode, PL38 with a different heater
- EL41/6CK5 (N150) – Power pentode, EL80 with a Rimlock base
- EL42 (N151) – Power pentode, EL85 with a Rimlock base
- EL44 – Power pentode, identical to UL44 except for heater ratings
- EL50, 4654 – 18 W Power pentode
- EL51 – 45 W Power pentode
- EL60 – Power pentode, EL34 with a B9G 9-pin Loctal base
- EL71/5902 – Subminiature 4 W AF power pentode, 8-pin all-glass wire-ended
- EL80/6M5 – Power pentode, EL41 with a Noval base
- EL81/6CJ6 – CRT horizontal deflection or stabilized power supply series regulator pentode
- EL82/6DY5 – CRT vertical deflection or AF power pentode
- EL83/6CK6 – CRT cathode drive power pentode
- EL84/6BQ5 (N709) – AF Power pentode
- EL85/6BN5 – 6 W RF/AF power pentode up to 120 MHz, for use in mobile equipment, EL42 with a Noval base
- EL86/6CW5 – Audio or CRT vertical deflection output power pentode, identical to LL86/10CW5, PL84/15CW5 and XL86/8CW5 except for heater ratings
- EL90/6AQ5 (N727) – 12 W AF Power pentode
- EL91/6AM5 (M8082, N709) – 4 W AF Power pentode
- EL95/6DL5 – Power pentode
- EL112 – 40 W AF/SW/VHF Radiation-cooled power pentode. EL152 or EL401 with a Y8A 8-pin steel tube base
- EL136 – Horizontal-output power pentode for 110° deflection color TV
- EL151 – Power pentode, Y10A steel tube 10-pin base
- EL152 – 40 W AF/SW/VHF Radiation-cooled power pentode. EL112 or EL401 with a B10V glass 10-pin base with one big pin for the anode; FL152 with a different heater
- EL153 – SW/VHF power pentode
- EL156 – Power pentode, Y10A steel tube 10-pin base
- EL171 – 4-Watts Power pentode, gnome tube
- EL172 – 8-Watts Power pentode, gnome tube
- EL173 – Power pentode, gnome tube, for TV receivers
- EL180/12BY7 – Power pentode
- EL183 – CRT cathode drive power pentode
- EL300/6FN5 – CRT horizontal deflection output power pentode
- EL360 – Power pentode for use in radar scanners, series regulators and pulse modulators
- EL401 – 40 W AF/SW/VHF Radiation-cooled power transmitter pentode. EL112 or EL152 with a B8G Loctal base
- EL500/6GB5 – CRT horizontal deflection output beam power pentode, magnoval base, identical to LL500/18GB5, PL500/27GB5 and XL500/13GB5 except for heater ratings
- EL502 – CRT horizontal deflection output power pentode
- EL503 – AF power pentode, magnoval base
- EL504 – CRT horizontal deflection output power pentode, PL504 with a different heater
- EL508 – CRT vertical deflection output power pentode, PL508/17KW6 with a different heater
- EL509/6KG6A – CRT horizontal deflection output power pentode, PL509/40KG6A with a different heater
- EL511 – Power pentode
- EL519 – Power pentode, PL519 with a different heater
- EL802 – CRT cathode drive power pentode for color TV, PL802 with a different heater
- EL803 – Wide band power pentode
- EL804 – Wide band power pentode
- EL805 – CRT vertical deflection output power pentode, PL805 with a different heater
- EL806 – CRT cathode drive power pentode
- EL821/6CH6 (6132) – CRT cathode drive power pentode for use in high definition television equipment
- EL822 – CRT cathode drive power pentode
- EL861 – Long-life RF power pentode for use as output amplifier in telecomms wide-area transmitters, identical to IL861 except for heater ratings

—Special quality:

- EL3010 – Power pentode
- EL5000 – AF power pentode
- EL5070/8608 – Wideband video power pentode, magnoval base
- EL8000 – Power pentode
- E55L/8233 – Wide-band power pentode for use as CRT vertical deflection electrode driver in oscilloscopes
- E80L/6227 – AF Power pentode, gold-plated pins
- E81L/6686 – Long-life power pentode for use in telephone equipment, gold-plated pins (No relationship to EL81)
- E84L/7320 – Power pentode for use in AF amplifiers and stabilized power supplies
- E130L/7534 – Wide band power pentode
- E235L/7751 – Power pentode
- E236L – Power pentode

=== ELL ===
- ELL1 – Dual power pentode
- ELL80/6HU8 – Dual power pentode, Noval base

=== EM ===
- EM1 (4678) – Top-view, "Magic Eye"-type tuning indicator, side-contact 8 Base
- EM2 – Top-view, "Magic Eye"-type tuning indicator; has a 6.3 V/200 mA heater and was therefore marketed as C/EM2; identical AM2 except for heater ratings
- EM4 – Dual-sensitivity, top-view, "Magic Eye"-type tuning indicator, EM34 with a side-contact 8 Base
- EM5 – Dual-sensitivity, top-view, "Magic Eye"-type tuning indicator, EM11 or EM35 with a side-contact 8 Base
- EM11 – Dual-sensitivity, top-view, "Magic Eye"-type tuning indicator, EM5 or EM35 with a Y8A 8-pin steel tube base
- EM34/6CD7 – Dual-sensitivity, top-view, "Magic Eye"-type tuning indicator, EM4 with an Octal base
- EM35 – Dual-sensitivity, top-view, "Magic Eye"-type tuning indicator, EM5 or EM11 with an Octal base

Note: Telefunken EM35s appear to have a different pin-out than examples from other manufacturers

- EM71 – Top-view, fan-type tuning indicator with an unusual offset cathode, B8G Loctal base, HM71 with a different heater, no relationship to DM71
- EM72 – EM71 with two segments of the fluorescent screen uncoated with phosphor, intended for indicating low and peak levels but not average level, useless for tuning but intended for recording level indication
- EM80/6BR5 – Side-view, fan-type tuning indicator for AM receivers, noval B9A base
- EM81/6DA5 – EM80/6BR5 with 25% greater sensitivity
- EM83 – Side-view, "Magic Balance" band-type dual-channel tuning/level indicator, two DC amplifier triodes and one electron gun for two separate screen anodes, noval B9A base, mainly for stereo use in tape recorders
- EM84/6DH7/6FG6 – Side-view, band-type tuning/level indicator, noval B9A base
- EM85 – Side-view, fan-type tuning indicator, identical to HM85 and UM85 except for heater ratings
- EM87/6HU6 (CV10407) – Side-view, band-type tuning/level indicator, noval B9A base
- EM171 – Dual-sensitivity, top-view, "Magic Eye"-type tuning indicator, gnome tube
- EM800 – Side-view, bar graph-type tuning/level indicator, noval B9A base
- EM840 – Side-view, band-type tuning/level indicator, noval B9A base

—Special quality:

- E82M – Side-view, rectangle-type dual-channel level indicator, two DC amplifier triodes control separate deflection rods before a 17mmx20mm screen anode, noval B9A base

=== EMM ===
- EMM801 – Side-view, dual, band-type indicator with brightness control, for voltage comparison
- EMM803 – Side-view, dual, band-type tuning indicator for FM-stereo receivers (field strength, 19kHz pilot present), noval B9A base

=== EN ===
- EN31 – 10 mA_{avg}, 750 mA_{peak}, Helium-filled, indirectly heated triode thyratron for high-frequency timebases and control equipment, Octal base with anode cap
- EN32/6574 – 300 mA_{avg}, 2 A_{peak}, 10 A_{surge}, Gas-filled, indirectly heated tetrode thyratron with negative control characteristic; for industrial control applications, Octal base
- EN70 – 20 mA_{avg}, 100 mA_{peak}, Subminiature, gas-filled, indirectly heated tetrode thyratron with negative control characteristic, 8-pin all-glass wire-ended
- EN91/2D21 (PL21, PL2D21, CV797) – 100 mA_{avg}, 500 mA_{peak}, 10 A_{surge}, Gas-filled, indirectly heated tetrode thyratron, negative starter voltage, miniature 7-pin base, for relay and grid-controlled rectifier service
- EN92 – 25 mA_{avg}, 100 mA_{peak}, 2 A_{surge}, Gas-filled, indirectly heated tetrode thyratron, negative starter voltage, miniature 7-pin base, for industrial control

=== EQ ===
- EQ40 – Nonode for FM quadrature detection
- EQ80/6BE7 – Nonode for FM quadrature detection or as phase detector in TV flywheel sync circuits
- EQ171 – Nonode, gnome tube

=== ES ===
- ES111 – TV sync oscillator (German: Kipp-Pentode), a special power relaxation oscillator pentode, an attempt to cut costs on TV receiver production; one ES111 each were needed for vertical and horizontal deflection; the output power for the deflection yoke was extracted not from the anode, but from the screen grid, the sync pulses were applied to the suppressor grid via a separate pin. The anode acted only as a small-signal amplified/gated-sync output which was added to the feedback from an auxiliary winding on the deflection yoke, and fed to the control grid. As there was no vertical deflection output transformer, a secondary, magnetically decoupled vertical deflection yoke received a variable, smoothed-out part of the screen grid current to compensate for its DC component in the primary vertical deflection yoke; it was variable to adjust the vertical picture position on the CRT screen. The screen grid delivered enough power even for an EHT winding on the horizontal deflection output transformer and for the 6.3V/0.2A heater of an RFG5 16-kV EHT rectifier. Y8A 8-pin steel tube base with 2 unused pins, screen grid on top cap; compare US111

=== ET ===
- ET51 – Trochotron, an electron-beam decade counter tube

—Special quality:

- E1T – Trochotron with side-viewing, fluorescent-screen readout
- E80T/6218 (CV5724) – Modulated, single-anode beam deflection tube for pulse generation up to 375 MHz; shock resistant up to 500 g

=== EW ===
- EW60 – 700 V_{PIV}, 400 mA, Gas-filled, half wave rectifier, B9G 9-pin Loctal base with 2 unused pins

=== EY ===
- EY1 – Half-wave rectifier, EY51 with a B4B 4-pin subminiature base
- EY51/6X2 – Half-wave rectifier, wire-ended version of EY1
- EY70 – 850 V half-wave rectifier, 8-pin all-glass wire-ended
- EY80 – CRT horizontal deflection output booster/damper/efficiency diode, identical to PY80 except for heater ratings
- EY81/6R3 – TV horizontal output booster diode
- EY82/6N3 – Half-wave rectifier, PY82 with a different heater
- EY83 – TV horizontal output booster diode, PY83 with a different heater
- EY84 – Half-wave rectifier for operation at high altitudes
- EY86 – Identical to DY86 except for heater ratings
- EY87 – Identical to DY87 except for heater ratings. Electrically identical to DY86/EY86 but glass envelope treated for high humidity or low pressure conditions
- EY88/6AL3 – TV horizontal output booster diode, identical to LY88/20AQ3, PY88/30AE3 and XY88/16AQ3 except for heater ratings
- EY91 – Half-wave rectifier
- EY500A/6EC4A – Identical to PY500A except for heater ratings
- EY802 – Identical to DY802 except for heater ratings
- EY3000 – 800 V, 750 mA Half-wave rectifier

=== EYY ===
- EYY13 – Dual rectifier, separate cathodes

=== EZ ===
- EZ1 – 250 V, 50 mA Full-wave power rectifier for 6V car radios, identical to FZ1 except for heater ratings
- EZ2 – Full-wave power rectifier
- EZ3 – Full-wave power rectifier
- EZ4 – Full-wave power rectifier
- EZ11 – Full-wave power rectifier for vehicle equipment
- EZ12 – Full-wave power rectifier
- EZ22 – Full-wave power rectifier
- EZ35 – Full-wave power rectifier
- EZ40 – Full-wave power rectifier, GZ40 with a different heater
- EZ41 – Full-wave power rectifier
- EZ80/6V4 – Full-wave power rectifier
- EZ81/6CA4 – Full-wave power rectifier
- EZ90/6X4 – Full-wave power rectifier
- EZ91 – Full-wave power rectifier
- EZ150 – Dual power rectifier, separate cathodes, Y10A steel tube 10-pin base

—Special quality:

- E90Z – Full-wave power rectifier

== F - 12.6 V heater ==
=== FL ===
- FL152 – Identical to EL152 except for heater ratings

=== FZ ===
- FZ1 – 250 V, 50 mA Full wave power rectifier for 12V car radios, identical to EZ1 except for heater ratings

== G - 5.0 V heater or misc. ==
=== GA ===
- GA560 – Directly heated saturated-emission vacuum noise diode, all-glass, 3-pin base

=== GY ===
- GY11 – Half-wave power rectifier, anode on top cap
- GY86 – Half-wave, CRT EHT power rectifier, anode on top cap
- GY501 – Half-wave, CRT EHT power rectifier for color TV, anode on top cap
- GY802 – Half-wave, CRT EHT power rectifier, anode on top cap

=== GZ ===
- GZ30/5Z4-G – Full-wave power rectifier
- GZ32/5V4/5AQ4 – Full-wave power rectifier
- GZ33 – Full-wave power rectifier
- GZ34/5AR4 – Full-wave power rectifier
- GZ37 – Full-wave power rectifier
- GZ40 – Full-wave power rectifier, EZ40 with a different heater
- GZ41 – Full-wave power rectifier

== H - 150 mA heater ==
=== HAA ===
- HAA91/12AL5 – Dual diode with separate cathodes, miniature 7-pin base, identical to EAA91/6AL5, UAA91 and XAA91/3AL5 except for heater ratings

=== HABC ===
- HABC80/19T8 – High-mu triode, triple diode (two on common cathode with triode, one with independent cathode), Noval base, used as an AF amplifier, AM detector and ratio detector in AC-powered post-war European AM/FM radios; identical to 5T8, 6T8, EABC80/6AK8, PABC80/9AK8 and UABC80/27AK8 except for heater ratings

=== HBC ===
- HBC90/12AT6 – High-mu triode and common cathode dual diode, miniature 7-pin base, EBC90/6AT6 with a different heater
- HBC91/12AV6 – High-mu AF triode and common cathode dual diode, for use in FM ratio detectors, miniature 7-pin base, EBC91/6AV6 with a different heater

=== HCC ===
- HCC85/17EW8 – Dual triode for use as VHF oscillator/mixer up to 200 MHz, noval base, identical to ECC85/6AQ8, PCC85/9AQ8 and UCC85 except for heater ratings

=== HCH ===
- HCH81 – Remote-cutoff triode/heptode oscillator/mixer, noval base, UCH81/19D8 with a different heater

=== HF ===
- HF85 – Remote-cutoff wideband RF Pentode, identical to EF85/6BY7 and XF85 except for heater ratings
- HF93/12BA6 – Remote-cutoff pentode, miniature 7-pin base, EF93/6BA6 with a different heater
- HF94/12AU6 – Sharp-cutoff RF/IF/AF pentode, miniature 7-pin base, identical to EF94/6AU6 and XF94/3AU6 except for heater ratings

=== HK ===
- HK90 – Heptode pentagrid converter, miniature 7-pin, EK90 with a different heater

=== HL ===
- HL84 – Audio power pentode, noval base, UL84 with a different heater
- HL90 – Audio power pentode, miniature 7-pin, EL90 with a different heater
- HL92/50C5 – Audio beam power pentode, miniature 7-pin
- HL94/30A5 – Audio power pentode, miniature 7-pin

=== HM ===
- HM34 – Dual-sensitivity, top-view, "Magic Eye"-type tuning indicator, EM34 with different heater ratings, UM4 with different basing and heater ratings
- HM71 – Top-view, fan-type tuning indicator, octal B8D/F base, EM71 with a different heater
- HM85 – Side-view, fan-type tuning indicator, identical to EM85 and UM85 except for heater ratings

=== HY ===
- HY90/35W4 – Half-wave rectifier, miniature 7-pin

== I - 20 V heater ==
=== IF ===
- IF860 – Long-life sharp-cutoff RF pentode for use as preamplifier in telecomms wide-area receivers, identical to EF860 except for heater ratings (95mA)

=== IL ===
- IL861 – Long-life RF power pentode for use as output amplifier in telecomms wide-area transmitters, identical to EL861 except for heater ratings

== K - 2.0 V heater ==
=== KA ===
- KA560 (6357) – Gas-filled, directly heated noise diode for the 10 cm band, waveguide output, B15d lamp base with anode top cap
- KA561 (6356) – Gas-filled, directly heated noise diode for the 7.5 cm band, waveguide output, B15d lamp base with anode top cap
- KA562 (6358) – Gas-filled, directly heated noise diode for the 3 cm band, waveguide output, B15d lamp base with anode top cap
- KA563 (6359) – Gas-filled, directly heated noise diode for the 1.25 cm band, waveguide output, B15d lamp base with anode top cap
- K50A (6358) – Neon-filled, directly heated noise diode for the 3 cm band, waveguide output, B15d lamp base with anode top cap
- K51A – Neon-filled, directly heated noise diode for the 10 cm band, waveguide output, B15d lamp base with anode top cap
- K81A – Directly heated saturated-emission vacuum VHF noise diode, noval base

=== KB ===
- KB1 – Directly heated dual diode with common cathode, poor performance as an AM detector lead to the introduction of the KB2; see introduction
- KB2 – Indirectly heated dual diode with common cathode

=== KBC ===
- KBC1 – Dual diode - triode
- KBC32 – Dual diode - triode

=== KC ===
- KC1 – Triode
- KC3 – Triode
- KC4 – Triode

=== KCF ===
- KCF30 – Triode and remote-cutoff pentode, oscillator/mixer

=== KCH ===
- KCH1 – Triode/hexode pentagrid converter

=== KDD ===
- KDD1 – Dual 1.5 W power triode

=== KF ===
- KF1 – RF/IF Pentode
- KF2 – RF/IF Pentode
- KF3 – Remote-cutoff RF/IF pentode
- KF4 – RF/IF Pentode
- KF7 – RF/IF Pentode
- KF8 – Remote-cutoff RF/IF pentode
- KF35 – Remote-cutoff RF pentode

=== KH ===
- KH1 – Hexode mixer, separate oscillator

=== KK ===
- KK2 – Octode pentagrid converter, KK32 with a side-contact 8 base
- KK32 – Octode pentagrid converter, KK2 with an Octal base

=== KL ===
- KL1 – Power pentode
- KL2 – Power pentode
- KL4 – Power pentode
- KL5 – Power pentode
- KL35 – 340 mW Power pentode

=== KLL ===
- KLL32 – 1.2W Dual power pentode

=== KY ===
- KY80 = U26 – CRT EHT rectifier. Noval base

== L - 450 mA heater ==
=== LCF ===
- LCF80/6LN8 – VHF mixer/oscillator triode/pentode, identical to ECF80/6BL8, PCF80/9A8, UCF80 and XCF80/4BL8 except for heater ratings
- LCF86/5HG8 – VHF mixer/oscillator triode/pentode, identical to ECF86/6HG8, PCF86/7HG8, 8HG8 and XCF86/4HG8 except for heater ratings
- LCF201/5U9 – Triode and pentode for use as IF amplifier and sync sep in TV receivers, decal base, identical to ECF201/6U9 and PCF201 except for heater ratings
- LCF801/5GJ7 – Medium-mu triode and sharp-cutoff pentode for use as VHF mixer in TV receivers, noval base, identical to ECF801/6GJ7, PCF801/8GJ7 and XCF801/4GJ7 except for heater ratings
- LCF802/6LX8 – Medium-mu triode and sharp-cutoff pentode for use as reactance and sinewave oscillator in TV receivers, noval base, identical to ECF802/6JW8, PCF802/9JW8 and 5JW8 except for heater ratings

=== LCL ===
- LCL84/10DX8 – High-mu TV sync sep triode - sharp-cutoff CRT cathode drive power pentode, identical to ECL84/6DX8, PCL84/15DQ8 and XCL84/8DX8 except for heater ratings
- LCL85/10GV8 – Triode - power pentode used in TV receivers for vertical timebase, generally as a multivibrator, with the pentode section doubling as one half of the multivibrator and the power output device, identical to ECL85/6GV8, PCL85/18GV8 and XCL85/9GV8 except for heater ratings

=== LF ===
- LF183/YF183/4EH7 – Frame-grid, remote-cutoff IF pentode for use in TV receivers, identical to EF183/6EH7 and XF183/3EH7 except for heater ratings
- LF184/YF184/4EJ7 – Frame-grid, sharp-cutoff IF pentode for use in TV receivers, identical to EF184/6EJ7 and XF184/3EJ7 except for heater ratings

=== LFL ===
- LFL200/11Y9 – Sync sep pentode - CRT cathode drive power pentode, decal base; identical to EFL200/6Y9 and PFL200/16Y9 except for heater ratings

=== LL ===
- LL86/10CW5 – Audio or CRT vertical deflection output power pentode, identical to EL86/6CW5, PL84/15CW5 and XL86/8CW5 except for heater ratings
- LL500/18GB5 – CRT horizontal deflection beam power pentode, magnoval base, identical to EL500/6GB5, PL500/27GB5 and XL500/13GB5 except for heater ratings

=== LY ===
- LY88/20AQ3 – TV horizontal output booster diode, identical to EY88/6AL3, PY88/30AE3 and XY88/16AQ3 except for heater ratings

== M - 1.9 V heater ==
=== MC ===
- MC1 – AF triode for use in audions

=== MF ===
- MF2 = RV2P800 – RF pentode
- MF6 = RV2P7 – RF pentode

== N - 12.6 V heater ==
=== ND ===
- ND4 – 600 MHz, 10 W VHF power triode

=== NF ===
- NF2 – Sharp-cutoff RF pentode; identical to AF7 and CF7 except for heater ratings, and also produced by JRC in the then-axis power of Japan
- NF3 – Remote-cutoff RF pentode identical to CF2 except for heater ratings
- NF4 = RV12P4000 – RF pentode
- NF6 = RV12P2000 – RF pentode

== O - No heater ==
Note: Philips sold a family of 150mA series heater tubes under this letter in South America: OBC3, OBF2, OCH4, OH4, OF1, OF5, OF9 and OM5

=== OZ ===
- OZ4 (0Z4) – 30 ≤ I ≤ 75 mA, Full-wave gas rectifier with common cathode, 6-pin octal base

== P - 300 mA heater ==
Note: Philips sold a family of 300mA series heater tubes under this letter in South America: PAB1, PBF2, PF9, PH4 and PM5

=== PABC ===
- PABC80/9AK8 – High-mu triode, triple low-voltage diode (two on common cathode with triode, one with independent cathode). Noval base, used as an AF amplifier, AM detector and ratio detector in AC-powered post-war European AM/FM radios and TV receivers; identical to EABC80/6AK8, 5T8, 6T8/6T8A, HABC80/19T8, UABC80/27AK8 and DH719 except for heater ratings

=== PC ===
- PC86/4CM4 – UHF Triode, EC86/6CM4 with a different heater
- PC88/4DL4 – UHF Triode, EC88/6DL4 with a different heater
- PC92 – RF Triode
- PC93 – Triode
- PC95/4ER5 – VHF Triode with variable mutual conductance, EC95 with a different heater
- PC96 – Triode
- PC97/4FY5 – Frame-grid VHF triode, identical to EC97/6FY5 and XC97 except for heater ratings
- PC900/4HA5 – VHF Triode

=== PCC ===
- PCC84/7AN7 – Dual triode for VHF cascode amplifiers, noval base. Identical to ECC84/6CW7 and UCC84 except for heater ratings
- PCC85/9AQ8 – Dual triode for use as VHF oscillator/mixer up to 200 MHz, noval base, identical to ECC85/6AQ8, HCC85/17EW8 and UCC85 except for heater ratings
- PCC88/7DJ8 – Dual triode for use as cascode amplifiers, ECC88/6DJ8 with a different heater
- PCC89 – Dual variable-mu triode for use as cascode amplifiers up to 220 MHz
- PCC189/7ES8 – Dual variable-mu VHF triode for cascode amplifiers; identical to ECC189/6ES8, XCC189/4ES8 and YCC189/5ES8 except for heater ratings

=== PCF ===
- PCF80/9A8 – VHF mixer/oscillator triode/pentode, identical to ECF80/6BL8, LCF80/6LN8, UCF80 and XCF80/4BL8 except for heater ratings
- PCF82/9U8A – Identical to ECF82/6U8 and XCF82 except for heater ratings
- PCF86/7HG8 – VHF mixer/oscillator triode/pentode, identical to ECF86/6HG8, LCF86/5HG8, 8HG8 and XCF86/4HG8 except for heater ratings
- PCF200 – Triode and pentode for use as IF amplifier in TV receivers, decal base, ECF200/6X9 with a different heater
- PCF201 – Triode and pentode for use as IF amplifier and sync sep in TV receivers, decal base, identical to ECF201/6U9 and LCF201/5U9 except for heater ratings
- PCF800 (30C15) – Triode - pentode
- PCF801/8GJ7 – Triode and pentode for use as VHF mixer in TV receivers, noval base, identical to ECF801/6GJ7, LCF801/5GJ7 and XCF801/4GJ7 except for heater ratings
- PCF802/9JW8 – Triode and pentode for use as reactance and sinewave oscillator in TV receivers, noval base, identical to ECF802/6JW8, LCF802/6LX8 and 5JW8 except for heater ratings
- PCF803 – Triode - pentode
- PCF805/7GV7 – Triode - pentode, ECF805 with a different heater
- PCF806 – Triode - pentode
- PCF812 – Triode - pentode

=== PCH ===
- PCH200/9V9 – Triode - Heptode, for TV sync sep, ECH200 with a different heater

=== PCL ===
- PCL81 – Identical to ECL81 except for heater ratings
- PCL82/16A8 – AF triode - AF power pentode, identical to ECL82/6BM8, UCL82/50BM8 and XCL82 except for heater ratings
- PCL83 – Triode - power pentode, ECL83 with a different heater and a lower mu triode.
- PCL84/15DQ8 – TV sync sep triode - CRT cathode drive power pentode, identical to ECL84/6DX8, LCL84/10DX8 and XCL84/8DX8 except for heater ratings
- PCL85/18GV8 – Triode - power pentode used in TV receivers for vertical timebase, generally as a multivibrator, with the pentode section doubling as one half of the multivibrator and the power output device, identical to ECL85/6GV8, LCL85/10GV8 and XCL85/9GV8 except for heater ratings
- PCL86/14GW8 – AF Triode - AF power pentode, used for audio amplification in European TV receivers, ECL86/6GW8 with a different heater
- PCL200 – Triode - power pentode, ECL200 with a different heater
- PCL802 – Triode - power pentode
- PCL805 – Triode - power pentode, ECL805 with a different heater

=== PD ===
- PD500 – 25 kV Color CRT EHT shunt stabilizer triode; may be replaced by the PD510 after rewiring the arc-safety shield pin of the socket. Identical to ED500 except for heater ratings
- PD510 – improved version of PD500. should never be replaced by PD500 in equipment designed for the PD510

=== PF ===
- PF83 – AF remote-cutoff pentode
- PF86 – Pentode for use in Transitron circuits in TV receivers. Identical to EF86/6BK8 and UF86 except for heater ratings

=== PFL ===
- PFL200/16Y9 – Sync sep pentode and CRT cathode drive power pentode, decal base; identical to EFL200/6Y9 and LFL200/11Y9 except for heater ratings

=== PL ===
- PL11 – Power pentode
- PL33 – CRT vertical deflection or AF output power pentode
- PL36/25E5 – British high voltage high frequency switching pentode valve. Used in TV receivers for horizontal output and/or EHT generation up to c1964. Octal base, anode on top cap. Last consumer electronics use DECCA series DR101, 202, 303, 404, 505, 606 monochrome receivers
- PL38 – CRT horizontal deflection output power pentode, EL38/6CN6 with a different heater

- PL38M – PL38 with an externally metalised envelope on a separate pin

- PL81/21A6 – CRT horizontal deflection output power pentode

- PL81A – Similar to PL81 but optimised for portable television designs

- PL82/16A5 – CRT vertical deflection output power pentode
- PL83/15A6 (N309) – CRT cathode drive power pentode
- PL84/15CW5 – Audio or CRT vertical deflection output power pentode, identical to EL86/6CW5, LL86/10CW5 and XL86/8CW5 except for heater ratings
- PL95 – AF Power pentode
- PL136 – Color TV 110° horizontal deflection output power pentode, octal base
- PL500/28GB5 – CRT horizontal deflection beam power pentode, magnoval base, identical to EL500/6GB5, LL500/18GB5 and XL500/13GB5 except for heater ratings
- PL502 – CRT horizontal deflection output power pentode
- PL504 – CRT horizontal deflection output power pentode, replacement for PL500, EL504 with a different heater
- PL508/17KW6 – CRT vertical deflection output power pentode for color TV, EL508 with a different heater
- PL509/40KG6A – CRT horizontal deflection output power pentode for color TV, EL509/6KG6A with a different heater
- PL511 – CRT horizontal deflection output power pentode
- PL519 – CRT horizontal deflection output power pentode, EL519 with a different heater
- PL521/29KQ6 – CRT horizontal deflection output power pentode, separate pin for grid 3 to minimize "snivets", magnoval base, identical to 21KQ6 except for heater ratings
- PL802 – CRT cathode drive output pentode for color TV, EL802 with a different heater
- PL805 – CRT vertical deflection output power pentode, EL805 with a different heater
- PL820 – CRT horizontal deflection output power pentode

=== PLL ===
- PLL80/12HU8 – Dual AF power pentode

=== PM ===
- PM84 – Side-view, band-type tuning/level indicator, UM84/12FG6 with a different heater

=== PY ===
- PY31 – Half-wave rectifier
- PY32 – Half-wave rectifier
- PY33 – Half-wave rectifier
- PY71 – Half-wave rectifier
- PY80 – EY80 with a different heater
- PY81 – TV horizontal output booster diode
- PY82 – EY82 with a different heater
- PY83 – CRT horizontal deflection output booster/damper/efficiency diode, EY83 with a different heater
- PY88/30AE3 – TV horizontal output booster diode, identical to EY88/6AL3, LY88/20AQ3 and XY88/16AQ3 except for heater ratings
- PY500A/42EC4A – TV horizontal output booster diode for color TV; identical to EY500A/6EC4A except for heater ratings
- PY800 – TV horizontal output booster diode

=== PZ ===
- PZ30 – Dual 200 mA rectifier, separate cathodes, octal base, for use as a voltage doubler in TV receivers

== S - 1.9 V heater ==
=== SA ===
- SA100 – Instrumentation rectifier diode up to 3 GHz
- SA101 – Instrumentation rectifier diode
- SA102 – Instrumentation rectifier diode

=== SD ===
- SD1A – Shortwave power triode
- SD3 – 750 MHz, 3.5 W VHF power triode

=== SF ===
- SF1A – Sharp-cutoff RF pentode, NF6 resp. RV12P2000 with a different heater

== T - Custom heater ==
Note: Tungsram preceded the M-P designation with the letter T, as in TAD1 for AD1

=== TY ===
- TY86F – 7.4 V, 77 mA heater version of the EY86 18-kV CRT EHT rectifier, for use as a hotfix in early-production Ferguson Radio Corporation TV receivers 306T and 308T where the horizontal-output transformer produced excessive heater voltage which destroyed the originally fitted EY86s.

== U - 100 mA heater ==
Note: Philips sold a family of 100mA series heater tubes under this letter in South America: UBC1, UBF2, UF8 and UL1

=== UAA ===
- UAA11 – Dual diode with separate cathodes
- UAA91 – Dual diode with separate cathodes, miniature 7-pin base, identical to EAA91/6AL5, HAA91/12AL5 and XAA91/3AL5 except for heater ratings
- UAA171 – Dual diode, separate cathodes, gnome tube

=== UABC ===
- UABC80/27AK8 – High-mu triode, triple low-voltage diode (two on common cathode with triode, one with independent cathode). Noval base, used as an AF amplifier, AM detector and ratio detector in series-heated post-war European AM/FM radios; identical to EABC80/6AK8, 5T8, 6T8/6T8A, HABC80/19T8, PABC80/9AK8 and DH719 except for heater ratings

=== UAF ===
- UAF21 – Diode - remote-cutoff pentode, EAF21 with a different heater
- UAF41 – Diode - pentode, EAF41 with a different heater
- UAF42/12S7 – Diode - remote-cutoff RF/IF/AF pentode

=== UB ===
- UB41 – Dual RF diode with separate cathodes, EB41 with a different heater

=== UBC ===
- UBC41 – Dual diode - AF triode, EBC81 with a Rimlock base and a different heater
- UBC81 – Dual diode - AF triode, EBC41 with a Noval base and a different heater

=== UBF ===
- UBF11 – Dual diode - pentode, EBF11 with a different heater
- UBF15 – Dual diode - pentode, EBF15 with a different heater
- UBF80/17C8 – Dual diode - remote-cutoff pentode
- UBF89 = 19FL8 – Dual diode - remote-cutoff pentode
- UBF171 – Dual Diode and remote-cutoff RF/IF/AF pentode, gnome tube

=== UBL ===
- UBL1 – Dual diode - power pentode
- UBL3 – Dual diode - power pentode
- UBL21 – Dual diode - power pentode
- UBL71 – Dual diode - power pentode

=== UC ===
- UC92/9AB4 – VHF triode for FM receiver frontends, single ECC81/12AT7 system, EC92/6AB4 with a different heater

=== UCC ===
- UCC84 – Dual triode for VHF cascode amplifiers, noval base. Identical to ECC84/6CW7 and PCC84/7AN7 except for heater ratings
- UCC85 – Dual triode for use as VHF oscillator/mixer up to 200 MHz, noval base, identical to ECC85/6AQ8, HCC85/17EW8 and PCC85/9AQ8 except for heater ratings
- UCC171 – Dual triode, gnome tube

=== UCF ===
- UCF12 – Triode - pentode, ECF12 with a different heater
- UCF80 – VHF mixer/oscillator triode/pentode, identical to ECF80/6BL8, LCF80/6LN8, PCF80/9A8 and XCF80/4BL8 except for heater ratings
- UCF174 – Triode and pentode, gnome tube

=== UCH ===
- UCH4 – Triode/heptode oscillator/mixer, UCH5 or UCH21 with an Octal base
- UCH5 – Triode/hexode oscillator/mixer, UCH4 or UCH21 with a side-contact 8 base
- UCH11 – Triode/hexode oscillator/mixer
- UCH21 – Triode/heptode oscillator/mixer, UCH4 or UCH5 with a B8G 8-pin Loctal base
- UCH41 – Remote-cutoff triode/hexode oscillator/mixer
- UCH42/14K7 – Triode/hexode oscillator/mixer, Rimlock base, ECH42 with a different heater
- UCH43 – Triode/hexode oscillator/mixer, low-microphonics version of UCH42; ECH43 with a different heater
- UCH71 – Triode/heptode oscillator/mixer
- UCH81/19D8 – Remote-cutoff triode/heptode oscillator/mixer, HCH81 with a different heater
- UCH171 – Triode/remote-cutoff heptode Mixer, gnome tube

=== UCL ===
- UCL11 – Triode - power tetrode
- UCL81 – Triode - power pentode, PCL81 with a different heater
- UCL82/50BM8 – AF triode - AF power pentode, identical to ECL82/6BM8, PCL82/16A8 and XCL82 except for heater ratings
- UCL83 – Triode - power pentode, PCL83 with a different heater

=== UEL ===
- UEL11 – Tetrode - power tetrode, VEL11 with a different heater
- UEL51 – Tetrode - power pentode, Y10A steel tube 10-pin base
- UEL71 – Tetrode - power pentode, EEL71 with a different heater
- UEL171 – Remote-cutoff tetrode and 4-Watt power pentode, gnome tube

=== UF ===
- UF5 – Pentode
- UF6 – Pentode
- UF9 – Remote-cutoff pentode
- UF11 – Pentode
- UF14 – Sharp-cutoff pentode, Y8A 8-pin steel tube base, identical to EF14 and VF14 except for heater ratings
- UF15 – Pentode, EF15 with a different heater
- UF21 – Pentode
- UF41 – Remote-cutoff RF pentode, EF41 with a different heater
- UF42 – Wide band pentode, EF42 with a different heater
- UF43 – Wide band, remote-cutoff pentode, EF43 with a different heater
- UF80/19BX6 – RF Pentode
- UF85/19BY7 – Remote-cutoff RF pentode
- UF86 – Identical to EF86 and PF86 except for heater ratings
- UF89 – Remote-cutoff IF pentode
- UF172 – RF/IF/AF Pentode, gnome tube
- UF174 – Pentode, gnome tube
- UF175 – Remote-cutoff RF/IF pentode, gnome tube
- UF176 – VHF Pentode, gnome tube
- UF177 – VHF Pentode, gnome tube

=== UFM ===
- UFM11 – Remote-cutoff AF pentode and top-view, "Magic Eye"-type tuning indicator, EFM11 with a different heater

=== UH ===
- UH171 – Sharp-cutoff heptode, gnome tube

=== UL ===
- UL2 – Power pentode
- UL11 – Power pentode
- UL12 – Power pentode
- UL21 – Power pentode
- UL41/45A5 – AF power pentode
- UL44 – Power pentode, identical to EL44 except for heater ratings
- UL71 – Power pentode
- UL84/45B5 – AF power pentode
- UL171 – 4-Watts Power pentode, gnome tube

=== ULL ===
- ULL80 – Dual power pentode, ELL80 with a different heater

=== UM ===
- UM4 – Dual-sensitivity, top-view, "Magic Eye"-type tuning indicator, Octal base, UM34 with a different pinout
- UM11 – Dual-sensitivity, top-view, "Magic Eye"-type tuning indicator made by Telefunken; EM11 with a different heater
- UM34 – Dual-sensitivity, top-view, "Magic Eye"-type tuning indicator, UM4 with a different pinout; HM34 with different heater ratings
- UM35 = 10M2 – Dual-sensitivity, top-view, "Magic Eye"-type tuning indicator
- UM80/19BR5 – Side-view, fan-type tuning indicator for AM receivers
- UM81 – Side-view, fan-type tuning indicator
- UM84/12FG6 – Side-view, band-type tuning/level indicator, PM84 with a different heater
- UM85 – Side-view, fan-type tuning indicator, noval base, identical to EM85 and HM85 except for heater ratings
- UM171 – Dual-sensitivity, top-view, "Magic Eye"-type tuning indicator, gnome tube

=== UQ ===
- UQ80 – Nonode, EQ80/6BE7 with a different heater
- UQ171 – Nonode, gnome tube

=== US ===
- US111 – TV sync oscillator, a special relaxation oscillator pentode with the suppressor grid on a separate pin to act as a second control grid; Y8A 8-pin steel tube base with 2 unused pins, screen grid on top cap. See ES111

=== UY ===
- UY1 – Half-wave rectifier
- UY2 – Half-wave rectifier
- UY3 – Half-wave rectifier
- UY4 – Half-wave rectifier
- UY11 – Half-wave rectifier
- UY21 – Half-wave rectifier
- UY31 – Half-wave rectifier
- UY41/31A3 – Half-wave rectifier
- UY42 – Half-wave rectifier
- UY82/55N3 – Half-wave rectifier
- UY85/38A3 – Half-wave rectifier
- UY89 – Half-wave rectifier
- UY92 – Half-wave rectifier

== V - 50 mA heater ==
Notes:

- Apart from AC/DC radios, "V" tubes were also used in miniaturized equipment with only one single supply for both anode and heater.
- VATEA Rádiótechnikai és Villamossági Rt.-t. (VATEA Radio Technology and Electric Co. Ltd., Budapest, Hungary) preceded the M-P designation with the letter V, as in VEL5 for EL5.

=== VBF ===
- VBF11 – Dual diode and pentode, EBF11 with a 38 V heater

=== VC ===
- VC1 – Triode, side-contact 8 base with grid on top cap, 55 V heater

=== VCH ===
- VCH11 – Triode/hexode mixer, Y8A 8-pin steel tube base, ECH11 with a 38 V heater

=== VCL ===
- VCL11 – Triode - power tetrode, 90 V heater, Y8A 8-pin steel tube base

=== VEL ===
- VEL11 – AF Tetrode - AF beam power tetrode, Y8A 8-pin steel tube base with E-tetrode grid on top cap, UEL11 with a 90 V heater

=== VF ===
- VF3 – Pentode, AF3 with a 55 V heater
- VF7 – Pentode, AF7 with a 55 V heater
- VF14 – Sharp-cutoff pentode, 55 V heater, Y8A 8-pin steel tube base, identical to EF14 and UF14 except for heater ratings

- VF14M – Selected VF14 in production until the end of the 1950s for use as a preamplifier in Neumann condenser microphones U-47 and U-48 where they were run at only half their rated heater power to reduce noise

=== VL ===
- VL1 – 1.6 W AF Pentode, side-contact 8 base, CL1 with a 55 V heater
- VL4 – 4 W AF Pentode, side-contact 8 base, CL4 with a 110 V heater

=== VY ===
- VY1 – 60 mA Half-wave rectifier, 55 V heater, side-contact 8 base
- VY2 – 250 V, 20 mA Half-wave rectifier, 30 V heater, side-contact 5 base

== X - 600 mA heater ==
=== XAA ===
- XAA91/3AL5 – Dual diode with separate cathodes, miniature 7-pin base, identical to EAA91/6AL5, HAA91/12AL5 and UAA91 except for heater ratings

=== XC ===
- XC95 – Triode, PC95 with a different heater
- XC97 – Frame-grid VHF triode, identical to EC97/6FY5 and PC97/4FY5 except for heater ratings

=== XCC ===
- XCC82 – Dual triode, identical to ECC82/12AU7 except for heater ratings
- XCC189/4ES8 – Dual VHF triode for cascode amplifiers; identical to ECC189/6ES8, PCC189/7ES8 and YCC189/5ES8 except for heater ratings

=== XCF ===
- XCF80/4BL8 – VHF mixer/oscillator triode/pentode, identical to ECF80/6BL8, PCF80/9A8, LCF80/6LN8 and UCF80 except for heater ratings
- XCF82 – Triode and pentode, identical to ECF82/6U8 and PCF82/9U8A except for heater ratings
- XCF801/4GJ7 – Triode and pentode for use as VHF mixer in TV receivers, noval base, identical to ECF801/6GJ7, LCF801/5GJ7 and PCF801/8GJ7 except for heater ratings

=== XCH ===
- XCH81 – Triode/heptode oscillator/mixer, ECH81/6AJ8 with a different heater

=== XCL ===
- XCL82 – AF triode - AF power pentode, identical to ECL82/6BM8, PCL82/16A8 and UCL82/50BM8 except for heater ratings
- XCL84/8DX8 – TV sync sep triode - CRT cathode drive power pentode, identical to ECL84/6DX8, LCL84/10DX8 and PCL84/15DQ8 except for heater ratings
- XCL85/9GV8 – Triode and power pentode for TV vertical output. Identical to ECL85/6GV8, LCL85/10GV8 and PCL85/18GV8 except for heater ratings

=== XF ===
- XF80 – RF/IF/Video pentode, identical to EF80/6BX6 and UF80 with a different heater, noval base
- XF85 – Remote-cutoff wideband RF pentode, noval base, identical to EF85/6BY7 and HF85 except for heater ratings
- XF94/3AU6 – Sharp-cutoff RF/IF/AF Pentode, miniature 7-pin base, identical to EF94/6AU6 and HF94/12AU6 except for heater ratings
- XF183/3EH7 – Frame-grid, remote-cutoff IF pentode for use in TV receivers, identical to EF183/6EH7 and LF183/YF183/4EH7 except for heater ratings
- XF184/3EJ7 – Frame-grid, sharp-cutoff IF pentode for use in TV receivers, identical to EF184/6EJ7 and LF184/YF184/4EJ7 except for heater ratings

=== XL ===
- XL36/13CM5 – Audio or CRT horizontal deflection output power pentode, EL36/6CM5 with a different heater
- XL84 – Power pentode, EL84 with a different heater
- XL86/8CW5 – Audio or CRT vertical deflection output power pentode, identical to EL86/6CW5, LL86/10CW5 and PL84/15CW5 except for heater ratings
- XL500/13GB5 – CRT horizontal deflection beam power pentode, magnoval base, identical to EL500/6GB5, LL500/18GB5 and PL500/27GB5 except for heater ratings

=== XY ===
- XY88/16AQ3 – TV horizontal output booster diode, identical to EY88/6AL3, LY88/20AQ3 and PY88/30AE3 except for heater ratings

== Y - 450 mA heater ==
=== YCC ===
- YCC189/5ES8 – Dual VHF triode for cascode amplifiers; identical to ECC189/6ES8, PCC189/7ES8 and XCC189/4ES8 except for heater ratings

=== YF ===
- YF183/LF183/4EH7 – Frame-grid, remote-cutoff IF pentode for use in TV receivers, identical to EF183/6EH7 and XF183/3EH7 except for heater ratings
- YF184/LF184/4EJ7 – Frame-grid, sharp-cutoff IF pentode for use in TV receivers, identical to EF184/6EJ7 and XF184/3EJ7 except for heater ratings

== Z - Cold cathode tube ==
Notes: Special-quality cold-cathode "Z" tubes had a different function letter scheme.

See also the professional tubes under Z

=== ZA ===
- Z960A – Cold-cathode surge protector for receiver frontends

=== ZC ===
- Z302C – Unusual decade Counter Dekatron, a counterclockwise-only decade counter tube with separate odd and even extinguishing electrodes except "0", which is tied to a -300V supply so reaching the terminal count produces a negative spike on the anode voltage which can be used to advance the next counter stage with no intermediate active components
- Z303C – Neon-filled, 4 kHz bidirecional decade Counter Dekatron
- Z563C – Neon-filled 4 kHz bidirecional decade Counter Dekatron
- Z565C – 4 kHz Bidirecional decade Counter Dekatron
- Z573C – Neon-filled 4 kHz bidirecional decade Counter Dekatron with aux anodes for direct control of Nixie tubes

=== ZE ===
- Z862E – Noble gas-filled, cold-cathode electrometer tube, control current 10 pA, silicone-coated envelope for isolation, guard ring, envelope inside radioactively coated for a constant ignition voltage

=== ZM ===
- ZM11 – Neon-filled digital indicator tube, 21 mm character height, top-viewing, showing a cross with a central dot and independent arms, for use in industrial control panels
- ZM13 – Neon-filled digital indicator tube, 21 mmCH, top-viewing, showing a vertical line and a circle with a small gap, for use in industrial control panels
- ZM13U – Neon-filled digital indicator tube, 21 mmCH, top-viewing, showing a vertical line and a circle, for use in industrial control panels
- ZM14 – Neon-filled digital indicator tube, 21 mmCH, top-viewing, showing a vertical line, a circle, a triangle and a three-winged star, for use in industrial control panels
- Z510M – 0 1 2 3 4 5 6 7 8 9 Neon-filled digital indicator tube, 15.5 mmCH, top-viewing, no decimal point
- Z520M See ZM1020
- Z521M See ZM1021
- Z522M See ZM1040
- Z550M See ZM1050
- Z560M – Z5600M with a red contrast filter coating
- Z561M – Z5610M with a red contrast filter coating
- Z565M – Gas-filled digital indicator tube with a dekatron-type readout, similar to GR10A, Z503M and ZM1050
- Z566M – Z5660M with a red contrast filter coating
- Z567M – Z5670M with a red contrast filter coating
- Z568M – Z5680M with a red contrast filter coating
- Z570M – Z5700M with a red contrast filter coating
- Z571M – Z5710M with a red contrast filter coating
- Z573M – Z5730M with a red contrast filter coating
- Z574M – Z5740M with a red contrast filter coating
- Z580M – Z5800M with a red contrast filter coating
- Z581M – Z5810M with a red contrast filter coating
- Z590M – Z5900M with a red contrast filter coating
- Z870M – Z8700M with a red contrast filter coating
- Z5200M See ZM1022
- Z5220M See ZM1042
- Z5600M – 0 1 2 3 4 5 6 7 8 9 Neon-filled digital indicator tube, 15.5 mmCH, top-viewing, no decimal point
- Z5610M – A V Ω + - ~ % W Neon-filled digital indicator tube, 15.5 mmCH top-viewing, for use in digital multimeters
- Z5660M – 0 1 2 3 4 5 6 7 8 9 Neon-filled digital indicator tube, 30 mmCH, side-viewing, no decimal point
- Z5670M – + - ~ Neon-filled digital indicator tube, 18/30 mmCH side-viewing
- Z5680M – 0 1 2 3 4 5 6 7 8 9 Neon-filled digital indicator tube, 50 mmCH side-viewing, no decimal point
- Z5700M – 0 1 2 3 4 5 6 7 8 9 Neon-filled digital indicator tube, 13 mmCH side-viewing, no decimal point
- Z5710M – + - ~ Neon-filled digital indicator tube, 10.5/13 mmCH side-viewing
- Z5730M – 0 1 2 3 4 5 6 7 8 9 Neon-filled digital indicator tube, 13 mmCH side-viewing, right decimal points
- Z5740M – 0 1 2 3 4 5 6 7 8 9 Neon-filled digital indicator tube, 13 mmCH side-viewing, left decimal points
- Z5800M – T G M k m μ n p Neon-filled digital indicator tube, 13 mmCH side-viewing
- Z5810M – A F H S V Ω Hz s Neon-filled digital indicator tube, 13 mmCH side-viewing, for use in digital multimeters
- Z5900M – 0 1 2 3 4 5 6 7 8 9 Neon-filled digital indicator tube, 10 mmCH side-viewing, both left and right decimal points
- Z8700M – 0 1 2 3 4 5 6 7 8 9 Neon-filled digital indicator tube, 10 mmCH side-viewing, no decimal point, 5 dual cathodes and separate odd/even anode compartments for biquinary multiplexing

Note: More Nixie tubes under professional - ZM and ETL examples

=== ZS ===
- Z502S – Neon-filled, 4 kHz max. decade Counter/Selector Dekatron
- Z504S (ZM1070, 8433) – Neon-filled, 5 kHz max. decade Counter/Selector Dekatron
- Z505S (ZM1060) – Argon-filled, 50 kHz max. decade Counter/Selector Dekatron
- Z562S – Neon-filled, 4 kHz max. decade Counter/Selector Dekatron, envelope inside radioactively coated for a constant ignition voltage
- Z564S – 25 kHz max. Decade Counter/Selector Dekatron, envelope inside radioactively coated for a constant ignition voltage
- Z572S – Neon-filled, 5 kHz max. decade Counter/Selector Dekatron, aux anodes to directly drive Nixie tubes, envelope inside radioactively coated for a constant ignition voltage

=== ZT ===
- Z50T – Subminiature, 6 mA_{avg}, 24 mA_{peak}, Gas-filled, cold-cathode trigger triode, 1 starter, 3-pin all-glass wire-ended, for use as switch in bang–bang controllers
- Z300T (PL1267) – 25 mA_{avg}, 100 mA_{peak}, Gas-filled, cold-cathode DC trigger triode, one starter, octal base
- Z900T/5823 – 25 mA_{avg}, 100 mA_{peak}, Gas-filled, cold-cathode AC trigger triode, one starter, miniature 7-pin base

=== ZU ===
- Z70U/7710 – Subminiature, 3 mA_{avg}, 12 mA_{peak}, Gas-filled, cold-cathode DC trigger tetrode, one starter and a primer electrode, positive starter voltage, 4-pin all-glass wire-ended
- Z71U/7711 – Subminiature, 7 mA_{avg}, 12 mA_{peak}, Gas-filled, cold-cathode DC trigger tetrode, two starters, positive starter voltage, low impedance for audio frequencies for use in a telephone exchange, 4-pin all-glass wire-ended
- Z700U – Subminiature, 4 mA_{avg}, 16 mA_{peak}, Gas-filled, cold-cathode DC trigger tetrode, one starter and a primer electrode, positive starter voltage, all-glass wire-ended, for use in Dekatron circuits up to 2...5 kHz
- Z701U – Subminiature, Gas-filled, cold-cathode trigger tetrode, all-glass wire-ended
- Z800U – 2.5 mA_{avg}, 10 mA_{peak}, Gas-filled, cold-cathode DC trigger tetrode, one starter and a primer electrode, positive starter voltage, noval base, for voltage control, sensitive relay circuits and timers
- Z801U – 2.5 mA_{avg}, 10 mA_{peak}, Gas-filled, cold-cathode DC trigger tetrode, one starter and a primer electrode, negative starter voltage, noval base, for use with Geiger-Müller tubes
- Z803U/6779 – 25 mA_{avg}, 100 mA_{peak}, Gas-filled, cold-cathode DC trigger tetrode, one starter and a primer electrode, positive starter voltage, noval base, for voltage control, sensitive relay circuits and timers
- Z804U/7713 – 5 mA_{avg}, 25 mA_{peak}, Gas-filled, cold-cathode AC trigger tetrode, one starter and a primer envelope coating, negative starter voltage, noval base, direct operation from a 200...250VAC mains grid but should be triggered only while V_{A} > 0
- Z805U/7714 – 5 mA_{avg}, 25 mA_{peak}, Gas-filled, cold-cathode AC trigger tetrode, one starter, two primers and separate cathode and anode shields on individual pins, positive starter voltage, noval base, direct operation from a 200...250VAC mains grid, for relay drivers, timers, photoelectric controls, etc.

=== ZW ===
- Z70W/7709 – 4 mA, Gas-filled, cold-cathode DC trigger pentode, two starters and a primer electrode, positive starter voltage, 5-pin all-glass wire-ended, for use in bidirectional counters
- Z660W (GR43) – 12 mA_{avg}, 50 mA_{peak}, Gas-filled, cold-cathode DC trigger pentode, two starters and a primer electrode, positive starter voltage, 5-pin all-glass wire-ended, envelope inside radioactively coated for a constant ignition voltage, for use in bidirectional counters
- Z661W (ZC1010) – 8 mA_{avg}, 50 mA_{peak}, Gas-filled, cold-cathode AC trigger pentode, two starters and a primer electrode, positive starter voltage, 5-pin all-glass wire-ended, envelope inside radioactively coated for a constant ignition voltage, for use in bidirectional counters
- Z700W – 4 mA, Gas-filled, cold-cathode DC trigger pentode, two starters and a primer electrode, positive starter voltage, 5-pin all-glass wire-ended, for use in bidirectional counters
- Z806W – Gas-filled, cold-cathode trigger tetrode, one starter and dual primer, noval base, used in elevator controls
- Z865W – 25 mA_{avg}, 200 mA_{peak} Gas-filled, cold-cathode AC/DC trigger tetrode, one starter and a primer electrode, low positive starter voltage for transistorized circuits, Noval base, envelope inside radioactively coated for a constant ignition voltage, for use as a relay driver

=== ZX ===
- Z860X – 40 mA_{avg}, 200 mA_{peak}, Gas-filled, cold-cathode DC trigger pentode, two starters, a primer electrode and an internal shield, positive starter voltage, noval base, envelope inside radioactively coated for a constant ignition voltage, for use in counters
- Z861X – 40 mA_{avg}, 200 mA_{peak}, Gas-filled, cold-cathode AC trigger pentode, two starters, a primer electrode and an internal shield, positive starter voltage, noval base, envelope inside radioactively coated for a constant ignition voltage, for use in counters
- Z863X – 40 mA_{avg}, 200 mA_{peak}, Gas-filled, cold-cathode DC trigger pentode, two starters, a primer electrode and an internal shield, negative starter voltage, noval base, envelope inside radioactively coated for a constant ignition voltage, for use in counters

== References and footnotes ==
=== General literature and data sheets ===
- Frank Philipse's Tube Datasheet Archive

- Mirrors in Brazil • Brazil searchable • Germany • Germany • Romania • Romania searchable • Sweden • US • US • US

- Tubebooks.org datasheet collection
- Roy J. Tellason's tube datasheet collection
- Klausmobile Russian tube directory
- General Electric Essential Characteristics, 1970

- RCA Receiving Tube Manuals R10 (1932) • RC11 (1933) • RC12 (1934) • RC13 (1937) • RC14 (1942) • RC15 (1948) • RC16 (1951) • RC17 (1954) • RC18 (1956) • RC19 (1959) • RC20 (1960) • RC21 (1961) • RC22 (1963) • RC23 (1964) • RC24 (1965) • RC25 (1966) • RC26 (1968) • RC27 (1970) • RC28 (1971) • RC29 (1973) • RC30 (1975)
- Scanned tube documentation (PDFs): Tubebooks • Frank Philipse • 4tubes
- Sylvania Technical Manual, 1958
- J. P. Hawker (ed), Radio and television servicing, Newnes, London, 1964
- Camera tube datasheets
- • Decoding type numbers
- Decoding Valve, Transistor and CRT Numbers
- Vacuum Tube Numbering Schemes, Bases & Bulbs
- European tube designation systems: • •

== See also ==
- List of vacuum tubes
