= EYY =

EYY or Eyy may refer to:

== EYY ==
- European Year of Youth, the 2022 European Years theme
- EYY, a series of Mullard–Philips vacuum tube 6.3 V heater models that includes the EYY13

== Eyy ==
- Eyy, a 2013 Telugu-language album and song by Krishna Kanth
