= EF50 =

High-frequency pentode tube

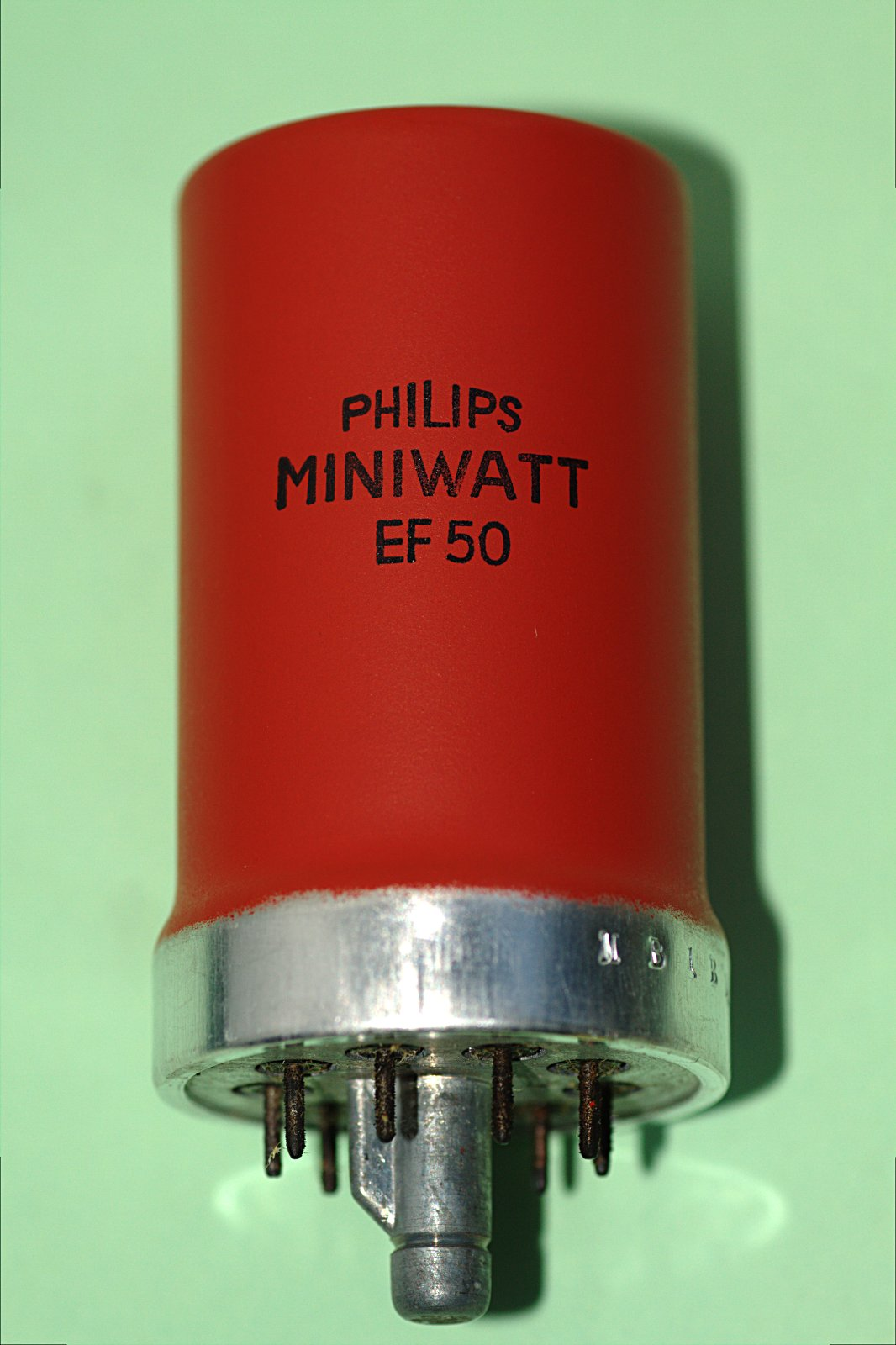
EF50

In the field of electronics, the EF50 is an early all-glass wideband remote cutoff pentode designed in 1938 by Philips. It was a landmark in the development of vacuum tube technology, departing from construction techniques that were largely unchanged from light bulb designs. Initially used in television receivers, it quickly gained a vital role in British radar, and great efforts were made to secure a continuing supply of the device as Holland fell in World War II.

The EF50 tube is a 9-pin Loctal-socket device with short internal wires to nine short chromium-iron pins. The short wiring was key to making it suitable for Very High Frequency (VHF) use.

== History ==
=== Early tube construction ===
Early vacuum tubes were built using light bulb techniques, which had been highly automated by the 1920s. In a standard light bulb of the era, the tungsten filament was supported on two metal rods, which were fastened together by inserting them into a glass tube and then heating the glass and squeezing it flat with the rods inside. The resulting support was known as the "glass pinch". The pinch was then inserted into a larger glass envelope, the bulb itself, welded, and then fit with a metal cap for the electrical connections.

For vacuum tube use, little was changed, with the various internal components supported on rods which passed through the pinch. As tubes grew in complexity, the number of leads also grew. Since light bulb sizes were standardized, all of these had to pass through the same pinch, which placed them increasingly close to each other. This led to increased capacitance, which limited the tube's ability to work at high frequencies. To address this, to some degree at least, it became somewhat common to attach the control grid leads to a metal button at the top of the tube rather than the bottom, but this made construction much more complex, as well as making connections in radio sets more difficult as they could no longer be on a single circuit board.

=== VHF experiments ===
Through the early 1930s, a number of companies experimented with metal tubes, using a variety of sealing methods. These worked well, but tended to be rather large and were never able to be successfully mass-produced at low cost. RCA continued experiments with all-glass tubes and introduced their "acorn" (or "door knob") tubes late in 1934. These were essentially two half-tubes that were assembled separately, carefully folded together, and then sealed along the centerline. Despite using low-cost materials and construction, the manual assembly led to high costs. In Germany, Telefunken introduced the "Stahlröhre" (~steel tube) with its own issues.

Philips had been working from 1934 to 1935 on an alternative that would solve the problems of the other base designs, in a system that could be produced cheaply and in large quantities. A presentation by M.J.O. Strutt from the tube development group at Philips Research at the first "Internationale Fernseh-Tagung in Zürich" (international television conference in Zürich) described their work in September 1938. A few months later, Professor J.L.H. Jonker, who had a leading role in the development of the EF50, published an internal Philips Research Technical Note, Titled: "New radio Tube Constructions". Jonker's role was confirmed decades later by Th. P. Tromp, head of radio-valve manufacturing and production: "Prof. Dr. Jonker (head of development lab of electronic valves in the mid-thirties) was the originator of the EF50. This development started as early as 1934–1935. It was, indeed, developed in view of possible television application."

Their first attempts faced problems due to the mechanical loads of the connection pins. If they used leads that were strong enough to be pushed into a conventional socket, these were large enough that the holes in the glass plate greatly reduced the plate's physical strength, and cracking was a serious problem. Thinner wires would solve this problem, but these proved difficult to connect to in the socket, and the tubes tended to disconnect when jolted. The solution was to use bent pins, which exited the bottom of the tube and were then bent through a 90 degree arc toward the center of the tube's base. These were used with a special socket; when pressed in and rotated slightly, the pins locked into place.

With this problem solved, the team then turned to consider whether the top control grid connection could be eliminated, as it had been in the RCA acorns. This was easy enough to do electrically, but Philips had already taken to using the metal cap on the electrode as a convenient place to hide the gas evacuation tube, used during the final steps of construction. They developed a way to weld the tube into the base plate instead of the top of the tube, but this left the tube projecting from the bottom, where it could be easily snapped off. The solution to this was a metal shell that was fit onto the bottom of the tube at the end of construction, covering the evacuation tube while allowing the connection pins to project through holes. This was known as "the metal trouser".

=== Television requirements ===
Pye Ltd., a leading British electronics firm of the time, had pioneered television receiver design, and in the late 1930s, wanted to market receivers that would allow reception further and further from the single Alexandra Palace television transmitter. In particular, they wanted to be able to receive these transmissions at their Cambridge factories. They initially turned to their subsidiaries, Cathodeon and Hi-Vac, but they were not capable of producing much of an improvement. They turned to Mullard, who turned to their Philips managers in Eindhoven. With some tweaking from Baden John Edwards and Donald Jackson from Pye (for example the metal shield), the final EF50 pentode was produced and used in Pye's 45 MHz TRF design, and created a receiver able to receive transmissions at up to five times the distance than the competition.

=== Radar uses ===
While Pye was working on their television systems, the top secret work on radar was being carried out at Bawdsey Manor. As part of this research, a team under Edward George Bowen was developing a receiver that was small and light enough to be used on aircraft. Their original design was based on a television chassis from EMI using RCA acorn valves. Only one set was available and almost lost in an accident, so Bowen was eager to find additional receivers.

When the war began in the summer of 1939, all work on civilian television was suspended. This left Pye with many completed chassis and no way to sell them. Edward Victor Appleton, who had been the thesis advisor for both Bowen and Harold Pye, mentioned these surplus chassis to Bowen and suggested he try them. Bowen contacted Pye and found that "scores and scores" of completed chassis were available. When tested, they were found to completely outperform the EMI model.

Operational requirements, mostly the size of the dipole antennas suitable for external mounting on an aircraft, demanded that short wavelengths be used, and the team had already selected 200 MHz as the basic operational frequency. Like the earlier EMI model, the Pye receiver was then adapted from the BBC 45 MHz standard to 200 MHz by adding a single step-down stage in front of an otherwise unmodified Pye chassis. The resulting "Pye strip" became the basis for many UK radar designs of the era, including AI Mk. IV and ASV Mk. II.

=== Flight from Holland ===
Because the EF50 had to come from Holland, yet was vital for the RDF (radar), great efforts were made to secure a continuing supply as the risk of Holland being overrun increased. Mullard in England did not have the ability to manufacture the special glass base, for example. Just before Germany invaded Holland, a truckload of 25,000 complete EF50s and many more of their special bases were successfully sent to England. The entire EF50 production line was hurriedly relocated to Britain. On 13 May, the day before the Germans flattened Rotterdam in 1940, members of the Philips family escaped together with the Dutch government on the British destroyer HMS Windsor, taking with them a small wooden box containing the industrial diamonds that were to be used to make the dies needed to make the fine tungsten wires in the valves.

== Characteristics ==
Base:	B9G
Heater:	6.3 V/0.3 A
Grid-anode capacitance:	0.007 pF
Transconductance:	6.5 mA/V @ I_{a}=10 mA, I_{g2}=3 mA, V_{a}=250 V, V_{g2}=250 V

== Equivalents ==
To meet great wartime demand, the EF50 was also made by Marconi-Osram (with the name Z90) and Cossor (their version named 63SPT) in the United Kingdom as well as Mullard (who were effectively using the Philips production line after it was moved from Holland). Versions were also made in Canada by Rogers Vacuum Tube Company and in the United States by Sylvania Electric Products.

British military (Ministry of Aircraft Production Specification) and U.S. JAN type numbers assigned to the EF50 include:

- ARP35 (Army Receiving Pentode 35)
- VR91 (Original A.M. Name)
- CV1091 (from 1943)
- ZA3058 (Army)
- ZC1051 or ZC/10E/92 (Army)
- 10E/92 (Air Ministry)

The tube was also assigned the GPO (PO)VT-207 type number, VT-250, and CV1578.

Valves of similar characteristics were produced with different bases, for example, the later EF42 and 9-pin miniature (B9A) EF80.

== See also ==
Philips 1939 data sheet

Mullard EF50 data sheet
