= Valve microphone =

Type of condenser microphone

A valve microphone is a condenser microphone which uses a valve amplifier rather than a transistor circuit.

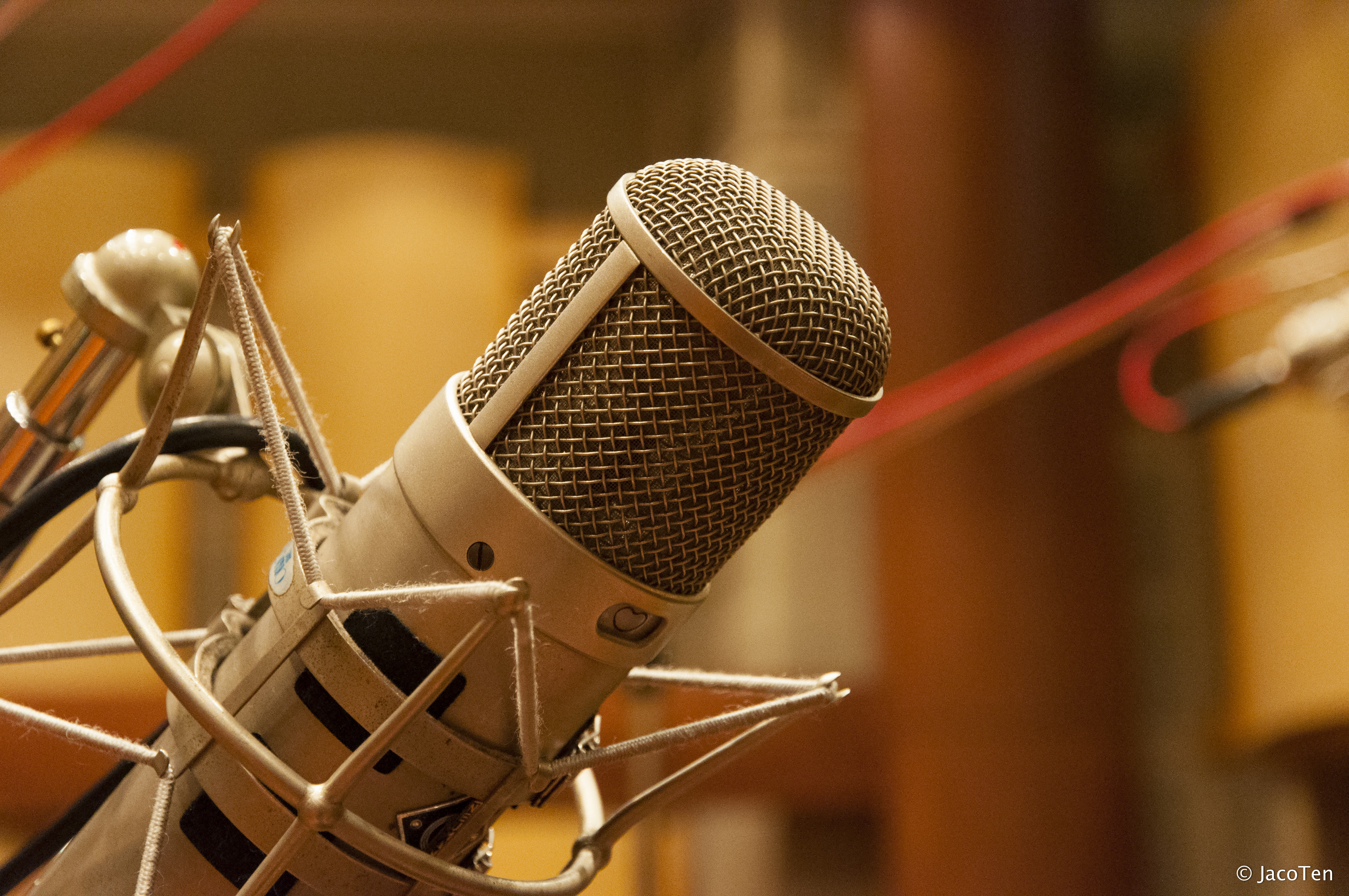
The Neumann U47 valve microphone

== History ==
Microphones have been in use since the early telephone technology of the mid 1800s. However, they achieved higher sound quality in the 1920s with the first double-button carbon mics made by Western Electric. The 387 model, with its 0.0017 inch thick gold-sputtered diaphragm, was the best among these early designs. It was followed by the improved model 600 in the early 1930s, and the double-button became recognised worldwide as a standard in broadcasting.

Vacuum tube or electronic valve amplifiers were first used to resolve microphone impedance and output problems. Bell Labs invented the condenser microphone in 1917, and this type of microphone went through many stages of improvement. Due to the invention of valve amplifiers, the production of simple moving coil mics like the Western Electric-designed 630A "8 Ball" became possible. This dynamic microphone went on to become one of the mainstays of American microphone production. In this period, valves were also incorporated internally into microphones, and valve microphones were commercially available as a result.

In the late 1920s, Dr. Harry F. Olson of RCA began developing the ribbon microphone, eventually using permanent magnets. In 1931, nine months after the introduction of Western's 618 dynamic, R.C.A. marketed a bi-directional ribbon microphone, the 44-A. The smooth, less sibilant sound of the ribbon and its elegant styling made it the standard for broadcasters into the 1940s. The design was updated with improved magnetic material in the mid thirties with the 44-B/-BX, which maintained its production until the mid 1950s. Ribbon microphones are still in demand today and come in many styles.

In June 1948, the Neumann U 47 was introduced, and distributed by Telefunken. The U47 was the first condenser microphone switchable between cardioid and omni-directional pick-up patterns. It incorporated the highly successful 12-micron-thick M7 capsule and VF-14 tube amplifier, which was a metal-clad pre-World War II pentode changed to work as a triode. These microphones had evolved from the 1928 CMV3 "bottle" mic, followed by the CMV3A which had interchangeable condenser heads. This mic was notoriously made use of by Hitler at the Berlin Olympics and at Nazi party rallies, and represented the state of the art in microphone technology at that time.

In 1958, Neumann took over the sale of their own mics from Telefunken and made many small changes to the U47 design; however, this mic perhaps more than any other, embodies the valve or tube sound. The design was perishable, so very few remain; therefore, it has become the most sought-after of studio microphones, although many clones and similar versions are now popular.

== Proliferation ==
There are many reasons why valve microphones have become so important in today's recording and home studios. Partly, they are fashionable due to their early use by influential composers and musicians such as the Beatles, Pink Floyd, the Rolling Stones, etc. But also, the sound quality they reproduce has pleasing sonic qualities, even though more technically perfect reproduction is possible with transistor microphones which have less self-noise.
