= Peak inverse voltage =

Characteristic of a diode rectifier circuit

The peak inverse voltage is either the specified maximum voltage that a diode rectifier can block, or, alternatively, the maximum voltage that a rectifier needs to block in a given circuit. The peak inverse voltage increases with an increase in temperature and decreases with a decrease in temperature. In simple terms, peak inverse voltage is the maximum reverse voltage that a diode can withstand.

== In semiconductor diodes ==
In semiconductor diodes, peak reverse voltage or peak inverse voltage is the maximum voltage that a diode can withstand in the reverse direction without breaking down or avalanching. If this voltage is exceeded the diode may be destroyed. Diodes must have a peak inverse voltage rating that is higher than the maximum voltage that will be applied to them in a given application.

== In rectifier applications ==
For rectifier applications, peak inverse voltage (PIV) or peak reverse voltage (PRV) is the maximum value of reverse voltage which occurs at the peak of the input cycle when the diode is reverse-biased. The portion of the sinusoidal waveform which repeats or duplicates itself is known as the cycle. The part of the cycle above the horizontal axis is called the positive half-cycle, or alternation; the part of the cycle below the horizontal axis is called the negative alternation. With reference to the amplitude of the cycle, the peak inverse voltage is specified as the maximum negative value of the sine-wave within a cycle's negative alternation.
