= 955 acorn triode =

Thermionic valve for VHF operation

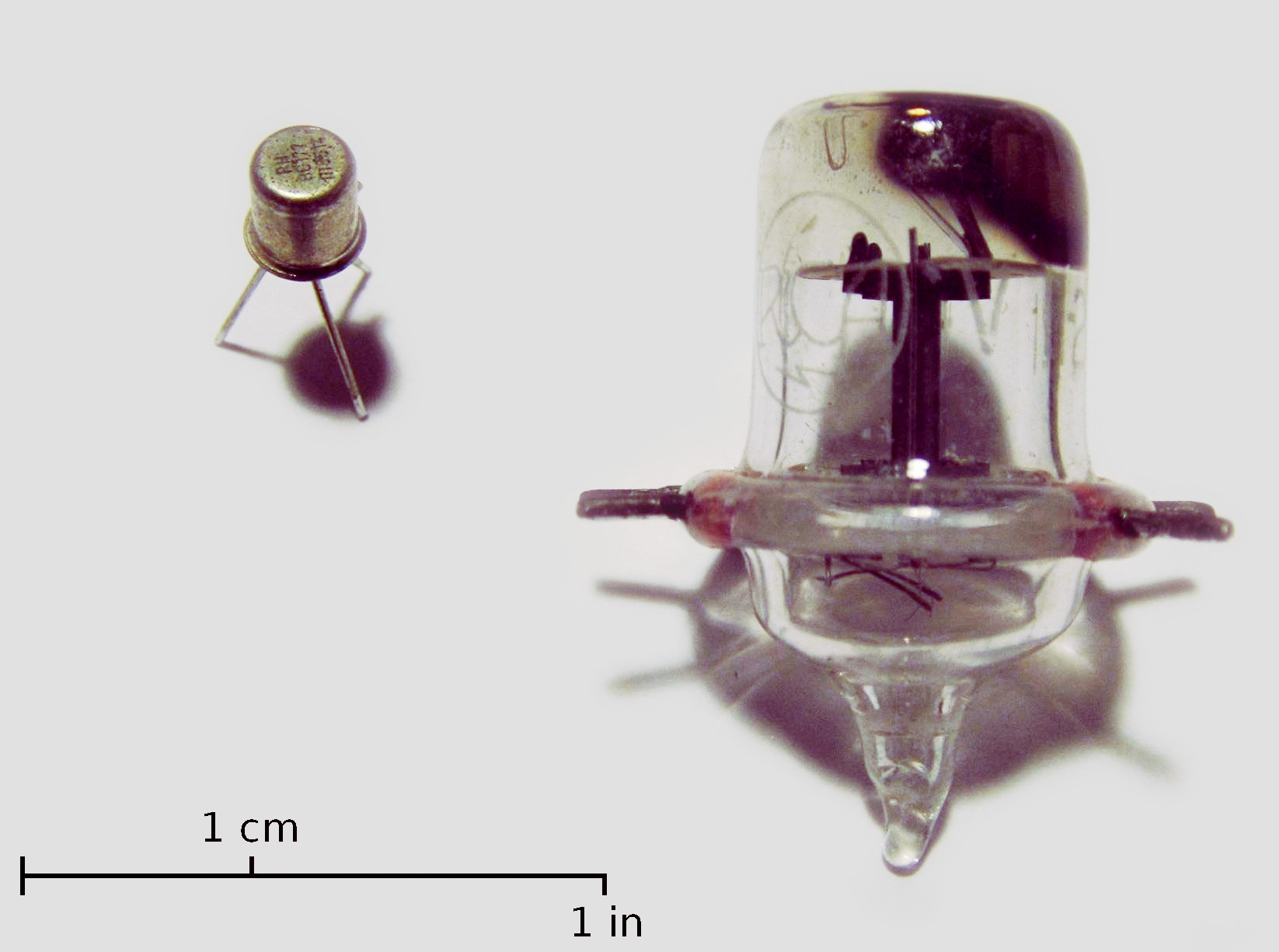
- Right: R.C.A. 955 U.H.F. Triode tube Left: TO-72 Transistor for comparison
- Classification: V.H.F. Triode
- Service: Class-A amplifier or oscillator

Cathode
- Cathode type: Indirectly heated
- Heater voltage: 6.3 V
- Heater current: 150 mA

Anode
- Max dissipation Watts: 1 W
- Max voltage: 250 V

Typical class-A amplifier operation
- Amplification factor: 20-25
- Anode voltage: 180 V
- Anode current: 4.2 mA
- Bias voltage: -5 V
- Anode resistance: 12.5 kΩ

References
- RCA Datasheets of 954, 955, 956, 957, 958A, 959; Philips Valve Data Book, Australia, 1954

The type 955 triode "acorn tube" is a small triode thermionic valve (vacuum tube in USA) designed primarily to operate at high frequency. Although data books specify an upper limit of 400–600 MHz, some circuits may obtain gain up to about 900 MHz. Interelectrode capacitances and Miller capacitances are minimized by the small dimensions of the device and the widely separated pins. The connecting pins are placed around the periphery of the bulb and project radially outward: this maintains short internal leads with low inductance, an important property allowing operation at high frequency. The pins fit a special socket fabricated as a ceramic ring in which the valve itself occupies the central space. The 955 was developed by RCA and was commercially available in 1935.

The 955 is one of about a dozen types of "acorn valve", so called because their size and shape is similar to the acorn (nut of the oak tree), introduced starting in 1935 and designed to work in the VHF range. The 954 and 956 types are sharp and remote cut-off pentodes, respectively, both also with indirect 6.3 V, 150 mA heaters. Types 957, 958 and 959 are for portable equipment and have 1.25 V NiCd battery heaters. The 957 is a medium-μ signal triode, the 958 is a transmitting triode with dual, paralleled filaments for increased emission, and the 959 is a sharp cut-off pentode like the 954. The 957 and 959 draw 50 mA heater current, the 958 twice as much. In 1942, the 958A with tightened emission specs was introduced after it turned out that 958s with excessively high emission kept working after the filament power was turned off, the filament still sufficiently heating on the anode current alone.

== Pin connections ==
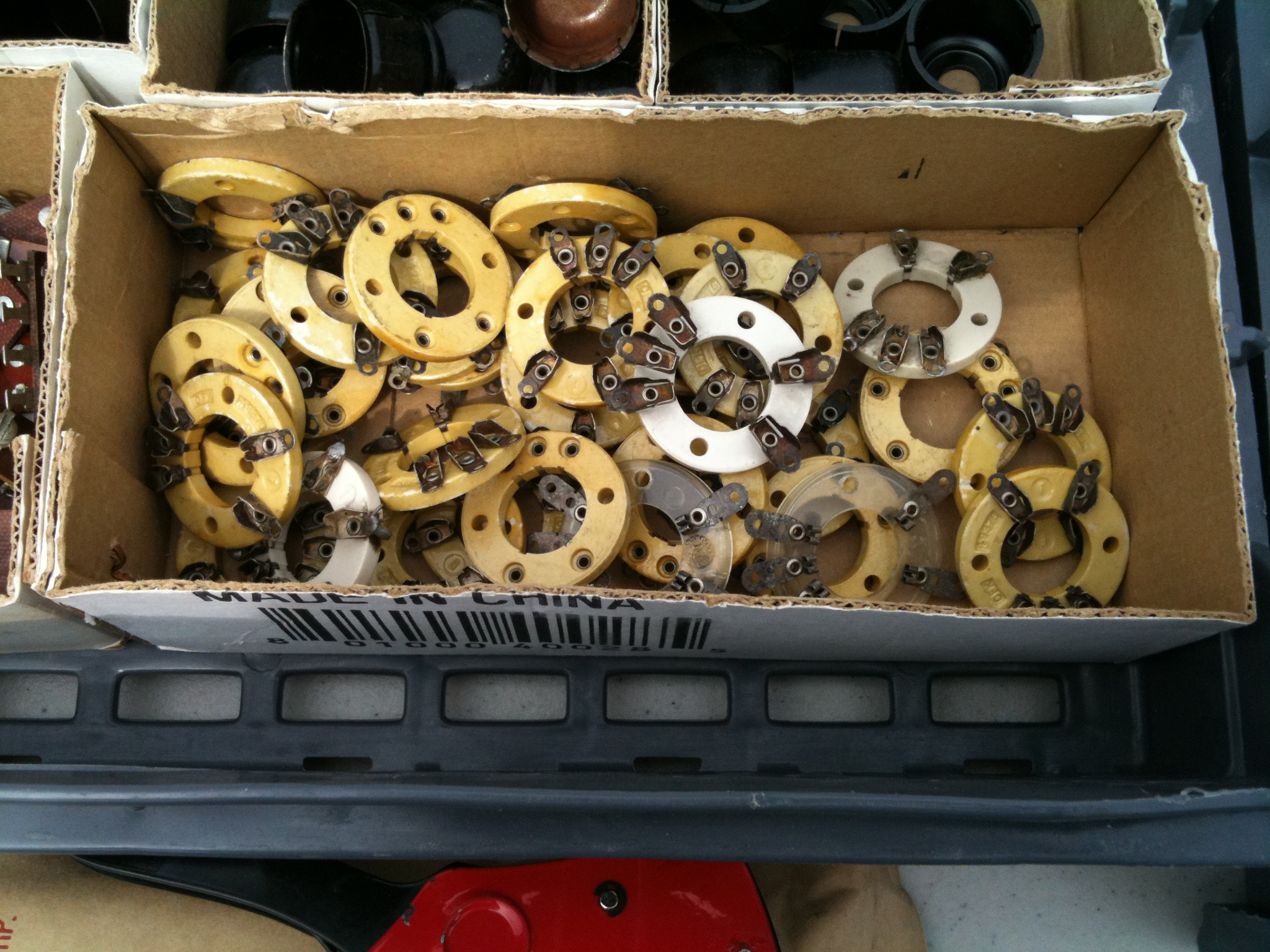
A box of Acorn sockets

When viewing the device from above (the end without the exhaust tip), the pins are arranged in a group of three and a group of two, starting with the centre pin in the group of three and going in a clockwise direction, the pins are cathode, heater, grid, anode, heater.

== Ratings ==
The 955 is an indirectly heated triode with heater electrically isolated from the cathode. The heater has a 6.3 volt rating, which it shares with many other common thermionic valves/electron tubes, and it draws about 150 mA.

The maximum anode voltage is 250 V, with an anode current of 420 microamperes and anode load 250 kilohm, and the maximum anode current is 4.5 mA at a voltage of 180 V with an anode load of 20 kilohm. The 955 is designed to be used in the frequency range of 60–600 MHz (5-0.5 metres wavelength). The amplification factor obtained is between 20 and 25 depending on details of the specific stage design and operating voltage.

== See also ==
- Micropup
