= Cut-off (electronics) =

State of negligible conduction when a control condition is met

In electronics, cut-off is a state of negligible conduction that is a property of several types of electronic components when a control parameter (that usually is a well-defined voltage or electric current, but could also be an incident light intensity or a magnetic field), is lowered or increased past a value (the conduction threshold). The transition from normal conduction to cut-off can be more or less sharp, depending on the type of device considered, and also the speed of this transition varies considerably.

== Cutoff values ==
=== Diodes ===
- Copper oxide diode: Usually between germanium and silicon diodes (0.2-0.5V)
- Diac: Depends on configuration.
- Germanium diode:apx 0.3 V; varying with temperature.
- Schottky diode:0.10–0.45, varying with temperature.
- Selenium diode:Depends on age and current. Usually higher than silicon diodes.
- Silicon diode: cutoff occurs when Vf falls below apx 0.7 V. The exact voltage varies with temperature.
- Thermionic diode: cutoff voltage depends on device design. Much higher than for silicon devices.
- Zener diode: reverse cutoff defined by diode voltage rating. Forward cutoff apx 0.6 V.

=== Transistors ===
- BJT: Depends on the configuration.
- Germanium transistor: apx 0.2 V, varying with temperature.
- MOSFET: Depends on the configuration.
- Silicon transistor: apx 0.6 V, varying with temperature.
- TRIAC: Also depends on the configuration.

=== Valves ===
- Triodes: triodes cut off when applied grid bias is too low. This will be a negative voltage under ordinary conditions.
- Tetrode, pentode etc.: There is some degree of interaction between the grids, and values will vary from one device to another. Anode voltage also affects cutoff voltage.

Prolonged periods in cut-off leads to cathode poisoning.

==== Remote cutoff ====
A vacuum tube (such as a pentode, but also sometimes triodes, hexodes, heptodes and so on) with its control grid given a helix with a variable pitch can be made to operate with more negative grid voltages, with reduced amplification, before it is completely cut off (i.e. yielding no significant output). This ability to vary the amplification (sometimes called mu) and also the transconductance, is useful in Automatic Gain Control (AGC) stages of radio receivers. Devices with this characteristic are called remote-cutoff or variable-mu or super-control types.

==== Sharp cutoff ====
With a normal control grid arrangement, a vacuum tube will have close to a square-law relationship between input (grid) voltage and output (anode/plate) current, with the latter falling sharply to roughly zero. This characteristic is normally required for linear RF and audio uses. Examples; EF86 and 6AK5.

==== Semi-remote cutoff ====
A semi-remote cutoff device has characteristics somewhere between a remote-cutoff device and a sharp-cutoff one.

== See also ==
- Diode
- Electrical conduction
- Electronic component
- Field effect transistor in JFET and MOSFET form
- Transistor
- Vacuum tube
