= Valve amplifier =

Type of electronic amplifier

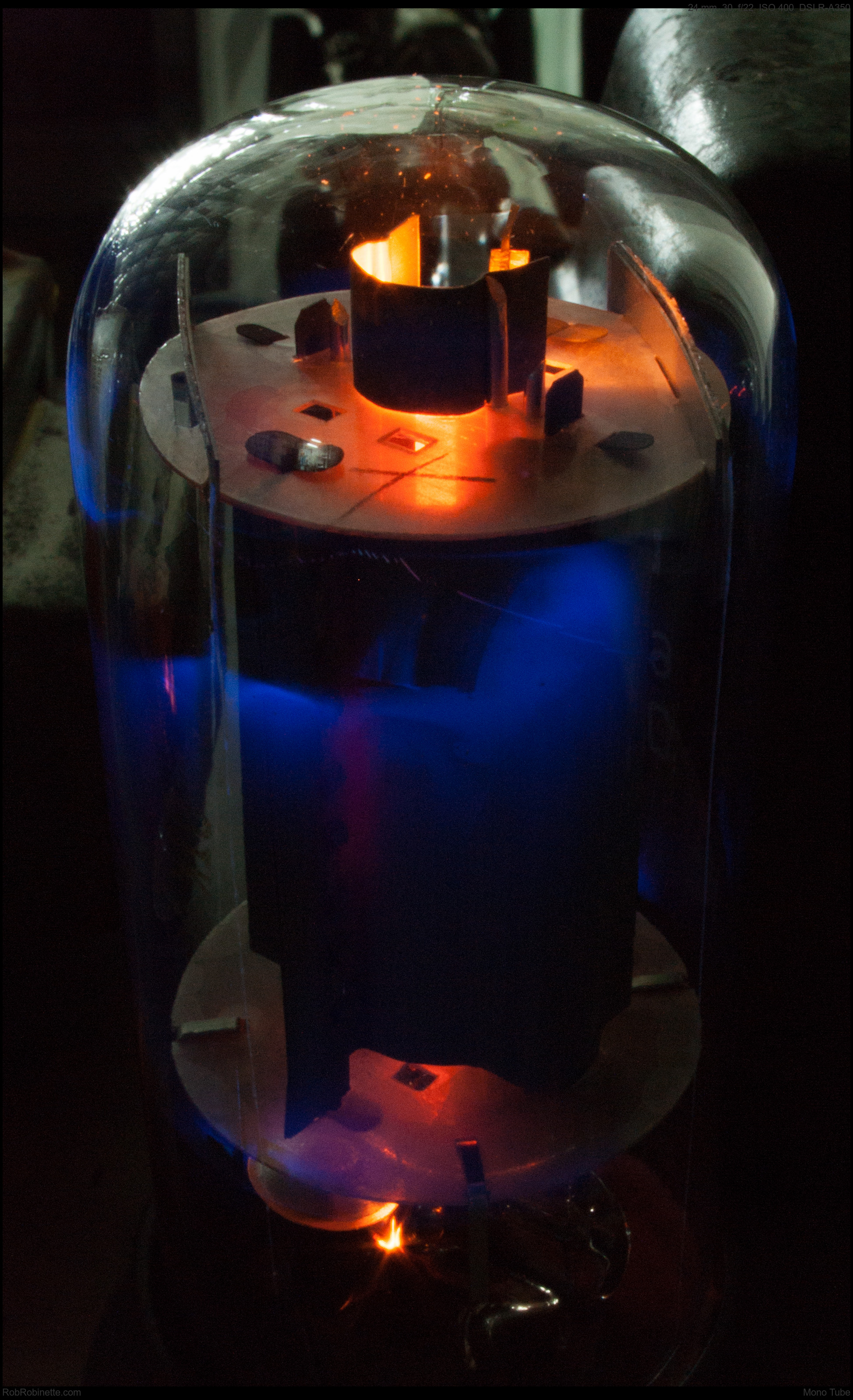
6N3C power tube.

A valve amplifier or tube amplifier is a type of electronic amplifier that uses vacuum tubes to increase the amplitude or power of a signal. Low- to medium-power valve amplifiers for frequencies below the microwaves were largely replaced by solid-state amplifiers in the 1960s and 1970s.

Valve amplifiers can be used for applications such as guitar amplifiers, satellite transponders such as DirecTV and GPS, high-quality stereo amplifiers, military applications (such as radar) and very high-power radio and television transmitters.

== History ==
=== Origins ===
Until the invention of the transistor in 1947, most practical high-frequency electronic amplifiers were made using thermionic valves. The simplest valve (named diode because it had two electrodes) was invented by John Ambrose Fleming while working for the Marconi Company in London in 1904. The diode conducted electricity in one direction only and was used as a radio detector and a rectifier.

In 1906 Lee De Forest added a third electrode and invented the first electronic amplifying device, the triode, which he named the Audion. This additional control grid modulates the current that flows between cathode and anode. The relationship between current flow and plate and grid voltage is often represented as a series of "characteristic curves" on a diagram. Depending on the other components in the circuit this modulated current flow can be used to provide current or voltage gain.

The first application of valve amplification was in the regeneration of long distance telephony signals. Later, valve amplification was applied to the 'Wireless' market that began in the early thirties. In due course amplifiers for music and later television were also built using valves.

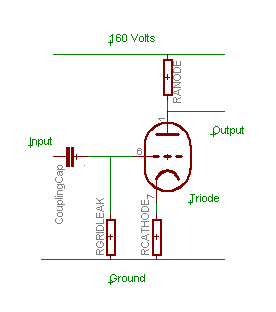
Circuit diagram of a single-ended triode

The overwhelmingly dominant circuit topology during this period was the single-ended triode gain stage, operating in class A, which gave very good sound (and reasonable measured distortion performance) despite extremely simple circuitry with very few components: important at a time when components were handmade and extremely expensive. Before World War II, almost all valve amplifiers were of low gain and with linearity dependent entirely on the inherent linearity of the valve itself, typically 5% distortion at full power.

Negative feedback (NFB) was invented by Harold Stephen Black in 1927, but initially little used since at that time gain was at a premium. This technique allows amplifiers to trade gain for reduced distortion levels (and also gave other benefits such as reduced output impedance). The introduction of the Williamson amplifier in 1947, which was extremely advanced in many respects including very successful use of NFB, was a turning point in audio power amplifier design, operating a push-pull output circuit in class AB1 to give performance surpassing its contemporaries.

=== Post-war developments ===
World War II stimulated dramatic technical progress and industrial scale production economies. Increasing affluence after the war led to a substantial and expanding consumer market. This enabled electronics manufacturers to build and market more advanced valve (tube) designs at affordable prices, with the result that the 1960s saw the increasing spread of electronic gramophone players, and ultimately the beginnings of high fidelity. Hifi was able to drive full frequency range loudspeakers (for the first time, often with multiple drivers for different frequency bands) to significant volume levels. This, combined with the spread of TV, produced a 'golden age' in valve (tube) development and also in the development of the design of valve amplifier circuits.

A range of topologies with only minor variations (notably different phase splitter arrangements and the "Ultra-Linear" transformer connection for tetrodes) rapidly became widespread. This family of designs remains the dominant high power amplifier topology to this day for music application. This period also saw continued growth in civilian radio, with valves being used for both transmitters and receivers.

=== Decline ===
From the 1970s the silicon transistor became increasingly pervasive. Valve production was sharply decreased, with the notable exception of cathode-ray tubes (CRTs), and a reduced range of valves for amplifier applications. Popular low power tubes were dual triodes (ECCnn, 12Ax7 series) plus the EF86 pentode, and power valves were mostly being beam tetrode and pentodes (EL84, EL34, KT88 / 6550, 6L6), in both cases with indirect heating. This reduced set of types remains the core of valve production today.

The Soviets retained valves to a much greater extent than the West during the Cold War, for the majority of their communications and military amplification requirements, in part due to valves' ability to withstand instantaneous overloads (notably due to a nuclear detonation) that would destroy a transistor.

The dramatic reduction in size, power consumption, reduced distortion levels and above all cost of electronics products based on transistors has made valves obsolete for mainstream products since the 1970s. Valves remained in certain applications such as high power RF transmitters and the microwave oven, and audio amplification equipment, particularly for the electric guitar, recording studios, and high-end home stereos.

=== Audio usage ===
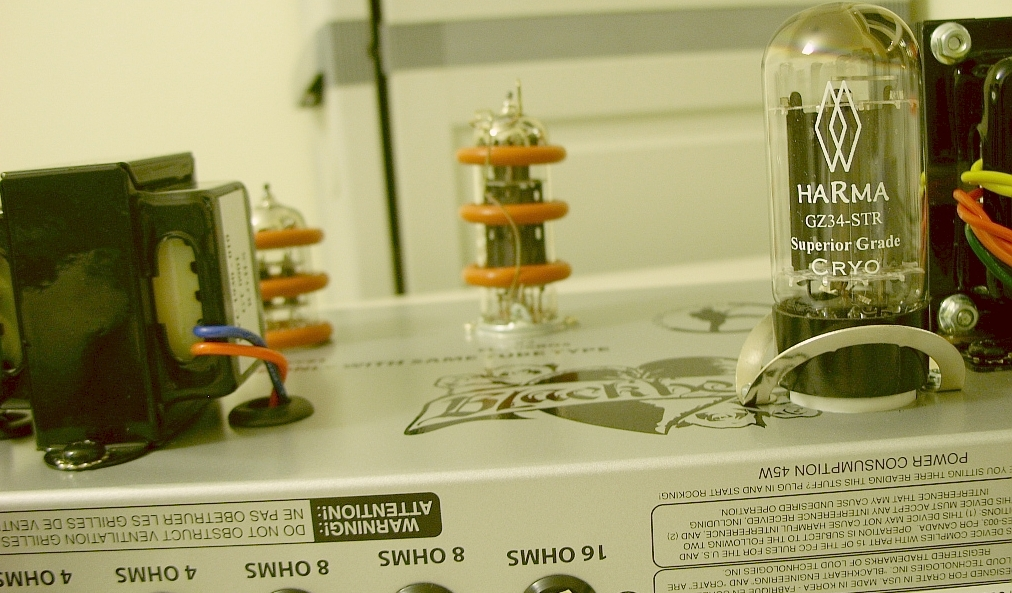
A single-ended class 'A' guitar amplifier chassis, with additional GZ34 valve rectifier installed.

In audio applications, valves continue to be highly desired by most professional users, particularly in recording studios' equipment and guitar amplifiers. There is a subgroup of audio enthusiasts who advocate the use of tube amplifiers for home listening. They argue that tube amplifiers produce a "warmer" or more "natural" valve sound. Companies in Asia and Eastern Europe continue to produce valves to cater to this market.

Many professional guitar players use 'tube amps' because of their renowned 'tone'. 'Tone' in this usage is referring to timbre, or pitch color, and can be a very subjective quality to quantify. Most audio technicians and scientists theorize that the 'even harmonic distortion' produced by valve tubes sounds more pleasing to the ear than transistors, regardless of style. It is the tonal characteristics of valve tubes that have sustained them as the industry standard for guitars and studio microphone pre-amplification.

Tube amplifiers respond differently from transistor amplifiers when signal levels approach and reach the point of clipping. In a tube amplifier, the transition from linear amplification to limiting is less abrupt than in a solid state unit, resulting in a less grating form of distortion at the onset of clipping. For this reason, some guitarists prefer the sound of an all-tube amplifier; the aesthetic properties of tube versus solid state amps, though, are a topic of debate in the guitarist community.

== Characteristics ==
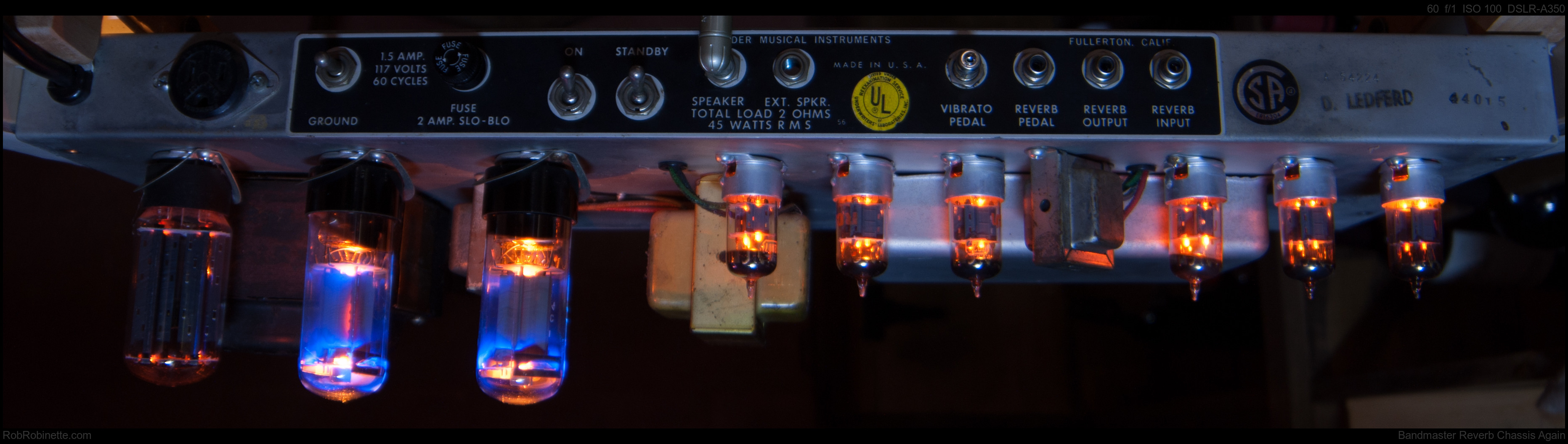
1960s Fender Bandmaster Reverb tube guitar amplifier chassis.

Power valves typically operate at higher voltages and lower currents than transistors - although solid state operating voltages have steadily increased with modern device technologies. High power radio transmitters in use today operate in the kilovolt range, where there is still no other comparable technology available. ([power = voltage × current], so high power requires high voltage, high current, or both)

Many power valves have good linearity but modest gain or transconductance. Signal amplifiers using tubes are capable of very high frequency response ranges – up to radio frequency and many of the directly heated single-ended triode (DH-SET) audio amplifiers use radio transmitting tubes designed to operate in the megahertz range. In practice, however, tube amplifier designs typically "couple" stages either capacitively, limiting bandwidth at the low end, or inductively with transformers, limiting the bandwidth at both ends.

=== Advantages ===
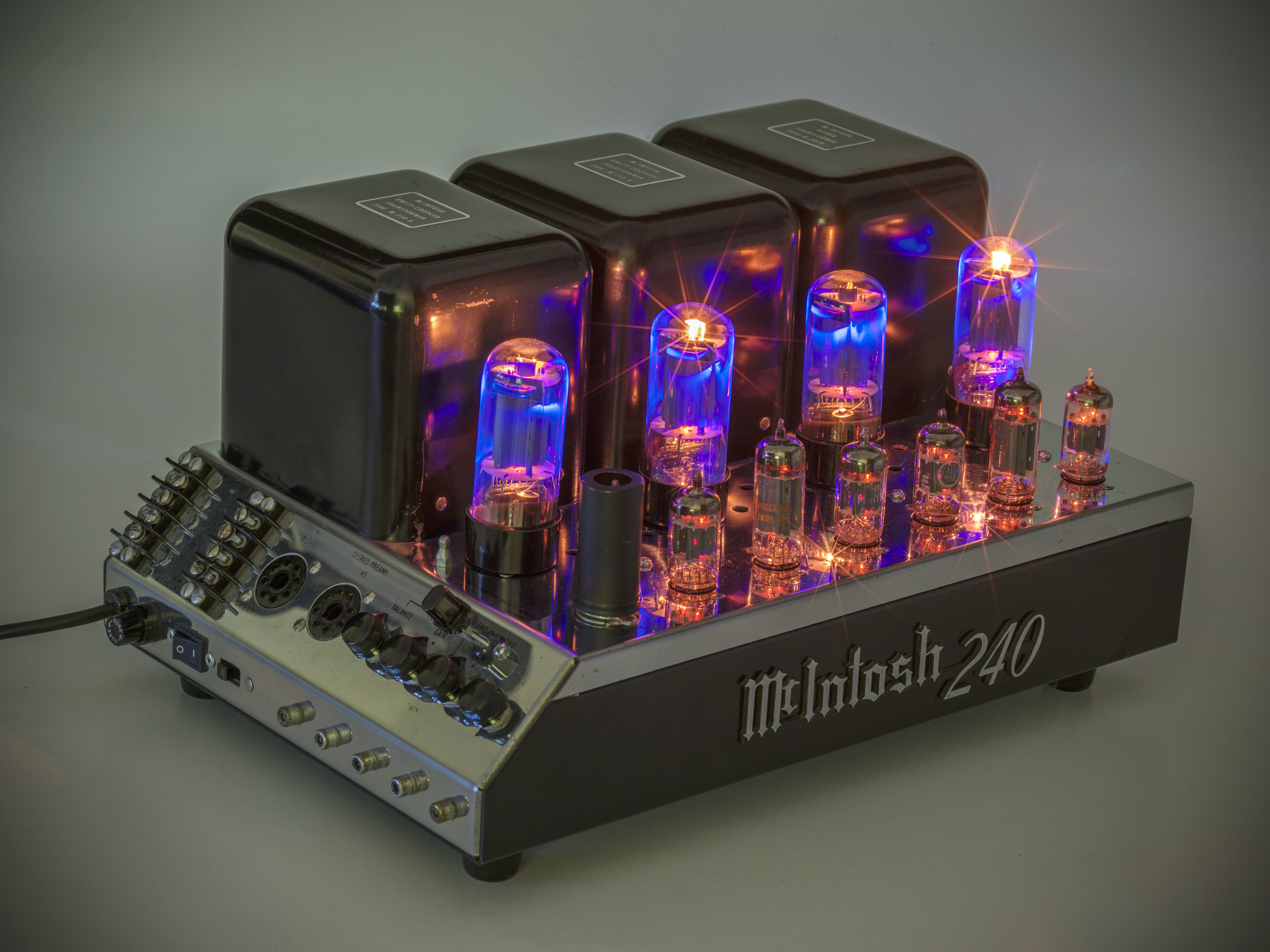
McIntosh MC240 from 1961 with exposed vacuum tubes

- Inherently suitable for high voltage circuits.
- Can be constructed on a scale that can dissipate large amounts of heat (some extreme devices even being water-cooled). For this reason valves remained the only viable technology for very high power applications such as radio and TV transmitters long into the age when transistors had displaced valves in most other applications.
- Electrically very robust, tolerating overloads that would destroy bipolar transistor systems in milliseconds, for minutes.
- Withstand very high transient peak voltages without damage, suiting them to certain military and industrial applications.
- Generally operate at applied voltages well below their maximum capability, providing long life and reliability.
- Softer clipping when overloading the circuit, which many audiophiles and musicians believe gives a more pleasant and more musically satisfying sound.

=== Disadvantages ===
- Bad linearity, especially with modest feedback factors.
- Tubes require a cathode heater. Heater power represents a significant heat loss and energy use.
- Tubes require higher voltages for the anodes compared to solid state amplifiers of similar power rating.
- Tubes are significantly larger than equivalent solid-state devices.
- High impedance and low current output is unsuitable for the direct drive of many real-world loads, notably various forms of electric motors.
- Valves have a shorter working life than solid state parts due to various failure mechanisms (such as heat, cathode poisoning, breakage, or internal short-circuits).
- Tubes are available in only a single polarity, whereas transistors are available in complementary polarities (e.g., NPN/PNP), making possible many circuit configurations that cannot be realized directly.
- Valve circuits must avoid introduction of noise from AC heater supplies.
- Microphonics – valves may sometimes be sensitive to sound or vibration, inadvertently acting like a microphone.

== Operation ==
All amplifier circuits are classified by "class of operation" as A, B, AB and C etc. See power amplifier classes. Some significantly different circuit topologies exist compared to transistor designs.

- The grid (where the input signal is presented) needs to be biased substantially negative with respect to the cathode. This makes it extremely difficult to directly couple the output of one valve to the input of a following valve as is normally done in transistor designs.
- Valve stages are coupled with components rated to withstand several hundred volts, typically a capacitor, occasionally a coupling transformer. The phase shifts introduced by coupling networks can become problematic in circuits that have feedback.
- There is no valve analog of the complementary devices widely used in "totem pole" output stages of silicon circuits. Push-pull valve topologies therefore require a phase splitter.
- The very high output impedance of valves (compared with transistors) usually requires matching transformers to drive low impedance loads such as loudspeakers or cutting lathe heads. The transformer is used as the load, in place of the resistor usually used in small-signal and driver stages. The reflected impedance of the transformer primary at the frequencies in use is much higher than the DC resistance of the windings, often kilohms. High performance transformers are, however, severe engineering compromises, are expensive and, in operation, are far from ideal. Output transformers dramatically increase the cost of a valve amplifier circuit compared to a direct-coupled transistor alternative. However, in both tube and solid state amps, matching output transformers are required for public address applications where low-loss high impedance/high voltage lines are used to connect multiple distant loudspeakers.
- The open loop linearity of valves, especially triodes, makes it possible to use little or no negative feedback in circuits whilst retaining acceptable or even excellent distortion performance (especially for small-signal circuits).

=== Topologies ===
- Linear small signal circuits almost invariably use a triode in the single ended gain stage topology (in class A), including the output stage.
- Broadband valve amplifiers typically use class A1 or AB1.
- Modern high power output stages are usually push pull, often necessitating some form of phase splitter to derive a differential/balanced drive signal from a single ended input, typically followed by a further gain stage (the "driver") prior to the output tubes. For example, a shunt regulated push-pull amplifier)
- single ended power stages using very large valves exist and dominate in radio transmitter applications. A sidebar is the observation that the niche "DH-SET" topology favored by some audiophiles are extremely simple and typically constructed using valve types originally designed for use in radio transmitters
- more complex topologies (notably the use of active loads) can improve linearity and frequency response (by removing Miller capacitance effects).

=== Output impedance ===
The high output impedance of tube plate circuits is not well matched to low-impedance loads such as loudspeakers or antennas. A matching network is required for efficient power transfer; this may be a transformer at audio frequencies, or various tuned networks at radio frequencies.

In a cathode follower or common-plate configuration, the output is taken from the cathode resistance. Because of negative feedback (the cathode-ground voltage cancels the grid-ground voltage) the voltage gain is close to unity and the output voltage follows the grid voltage. Although the cathode resistor can be many kilohms (depending on biasing requirements), the small-signal output impedance is very low (see operational amplifier).

== Applications ==
=== Audio frequency (AF) and broadband amplifiers ===
Valves remain in widespread use in guitar and high-end audio amplifiers due to the perceived sound quality they produce. They are largely obsolete elsewhere because of higher power consumption, distortion, costs, reliability, and weight in comparison to transistors.

==== Telephony ====
Telephony was the original application for audio amplification, and remained as the main usage for many years. A specific issue for the telecommunication industry was the technique of multiplexing many (up to a thousand) voice lines onto a single cable, at different frequencies. A single valve "repeater" amplifier can amplify many calls at once, and was thus very cost effective.

The problem is that the amplifiers need to be extremely linear, otherwise "intermodulation distortion" (IMD) will result in "crosstalk" between the multiplexed channels. This stimulated development emphasis towards low distortion far beyond the nominal needs of a single voice channel.

==== Audio ====
Today, the main application for valves is audio amplifiers for high-end hi-fi and musical performance use with electric guitars, electric basses, and Hammond organs, although these applications have different requirements regarding distortion which result in different design compromises, although the same basic design techniques are generic and widely applicable to all broadband amplification applications, not only audio.

Post World War II, the majority of valve power amplifiers are of the Class AB-1 "push pull" ultralinear topology, or lower cost single ended i.e. 6BQ5/EL84 power tubes, but niche products using the DH-SET and even output transformer-less topologies still exist in small numbers.

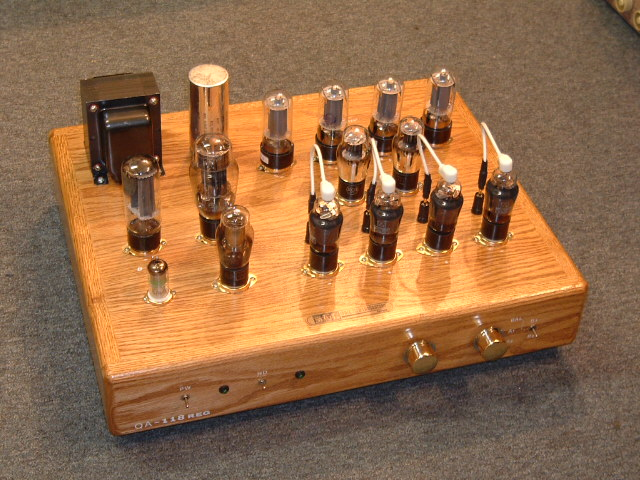
A pre-amplifier design using all power tubes instead of small signal tubes

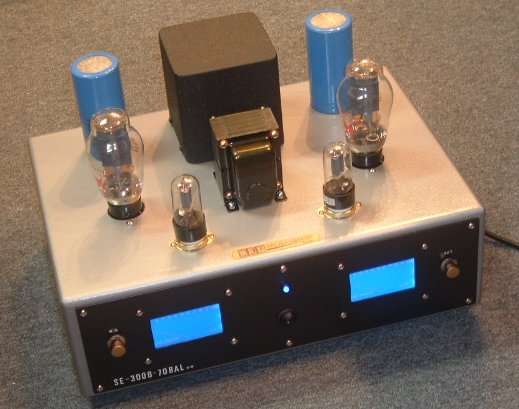
A 300B preamp/solid state output 70Wrms/ch hybrid amp

==== Instrumentation amplifiers ====
The basic moving coil voltmeter and ammeter itself takes a small current and thus loads the circuit to which it is attached. This can significantly alter the operating conditions in the circuit being measured. The vacuum tube voltmeter (VTVM) uses the high input impedance of a valve to buffer the circuit being measured from the load of the ammeter.

Valve oscilloscopes share this very high input impedance and thus can be used to measure voltages even in very high impedance circuits. There may typically be 3 or 4 stages of amplification per display channel. In later oscilloscopes, a type of amplifier using a series of tubes connected at equal distances along transmission lines, known as a distributed amplifier was employed to amplify very high frequency vertical signals before application to the display tube. Valve oscilloscopes are now obsolete.

In the closing years of the valve era, valves were even used to make "operational amplifiers" – the building blocks of much modern linear electronics. An op-amp typically has a differential input stage and a totem pole output, the circuit usually having a minimum of five active devices. A number of "packages" were produced that integrated such circuits (typically using two or more glass envelopes) into a single module that could be plugged into a larger circuit (such as an analog computer). Such valve op-amps were very far from ideal and quickly became obsolete, being replaced with solid-state types.

=== Narrow band and radio frequency tuned amplifiers ===
Historically, pre-WWII "transmitting tubes" were among the most powerful tubes available. These usually had directly heated thoriated filament cathodes that glowed like light bulbs. Some tubes were capable of being driven so hard that the anode itself would glow cherry red; the anodes were machined from solid material (rather than fabricated from thin sheet) to withstand heat without distorting. Notable tubes of this type are the 845 and 211. Later tetrodes and pentodes such as 817 and (direct heated) 813 were also used in large numbers in (especially military) radio transmitters

RF circuits are significantly different from broadband amplifier circuits. The antenna or following circuit stage typically contains one or more adjustable capacitive or inductive component allowing the resonance of the stage to be accurately matched with carrier frequency in use, to optimize power transfer from and loading on the valve, a so-called "tuned circuit".

Broadband circuits require flat response over a wide range of frequencies. RF circuits by contrast are typically required to operate at high frequencies but often over a very narrow frequency range. For example, an RF device might be required to operate over the range 144 to 146 MHz (just 1.4%)

Today, radio transmitters are overwhelmingly silicon based, even at microwave frequencies. However, an ever-decreasing minority of high power radio frequency amplifiers continue to have valve construction.

== See also ==
- Guitar amplifier
- Vintage musical equipment
- Klystron
- Robert von Lieben
- Traveling wave tube
- Valve audio amplifier – technical
- Valve RF amplifier
- Valve transmitters
