= OTL =

OTL may stand for:

- Oradea Transport Local
- Over-the-line, a variant of softball played mostly in Southern California
- Over time limit
- Output transformerless, a vacuum tube amplifier topology
- Outside the Lines, an American sports television series focusing on off-the-field stories
- Oracle Template Library
- An emoticon representing a kneeling or bowing person
- Overtime loss in ice hockey
- Otl Aicher, a graphic designer and typographer
- South Airlines, by ICAO airline code
- Ottawa Tool Library
- On the Loose (outing club), an outing club for the Claremont Colleges in Claremont, California, United States
- Overland Telegraph Line between Adelaide and Darwin, Australia
