= Circlotron =

Valve amplifier

Circlotron valve amplifier is a type of power amplifier utilizing symmetrical cathode-coupled bridge layout of the output stage. Original circlotrons of 1950s used output transformers to couple relatively high output impedance of vacuum tubes to low-impedance loudspeakers. Circlotron architecture, easily scalable, was eventually adapted to operate without output transformers, and present-day commercially produced circlotron models are of output transformerless (OTL) type.

== History ==
The Circlotron name emerged as a trademark of Electro-Voice. A U.S. patent for a circlotron High Fidelity Audio Amplifier was filed by Alpha Wiggins of Electro-Voice on March 1, 1954, and granted March 28, 1958. However, other inventors filed the same concept earlier:

- C. T. Hall filed Parallel Opposed Power Amplifiers on June 7, 1951; U.S. Patent 2,705,265 was granted on March 29, 1955.
- Tapio Köykkä filed on September 2, 1952; Finnish Patent 27332 granted on November 10, 1954; improved version was filed on September 30, 1955, Finnish Patent 29642 granted on April 10, 1958.

All these patents called for a transformer-coupled, fully balanced design; commercial transformerless amplifiers were not feasible at this time due to high costs of power supply capacitors required for an OTL design (at least thousands of microfarads at 200 volts or better). In the 1950s and 1960s, circlotrons were produced by Electro-Voice (eight models, 15 to 100 watts per channel), Finnish Voima and Philips. These inspired other local manufacturers, such as Carad. All these models employed output transformers and beam tetrode or pentode tubes (for increased efficiency). Similar amateur designs were published in the USSR. One can observe that the output stage of the successful McIntosh amplifier is a circlotron too because the special winding of the output transformer eliminates one of the two floating power supplies.

The concept was resurrected in its transformerless form in early 1980s by Ralph Karsten, founder of Atma-Sphere, which remains the principal contemporary manufacturer of circlotrons. Other OTL circlotrons were made by Tenor Audio, Joule Electra and Einstein Audio.

== Basic transformerless schematic ==
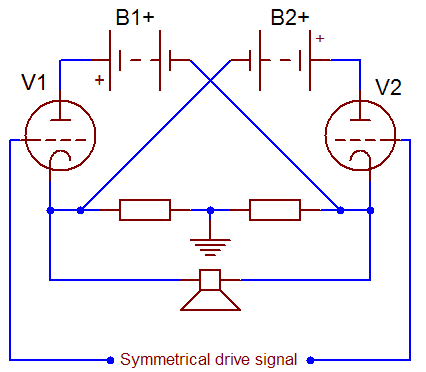
Simplified diagram (omitting grid bias network)

The electrical bridge of a circlotron is formed by a matched pair of triodes (V1, V2) and two floating power supplies ('B batteries'), B1+ and B2+. Grids of each triode are driven in opposite phases with a balanced, symmetrical input signal; differential current flows through the loudspeaker load and a simple, relatively high impedance, resistor network that ties floating supplies to the ground. Tubes are usually fixed biased with an external negative power supply ('C battery'); each side normally has independent bias adjustment to compensate for minor tube mismatch.

Output impedance Z of a transformerless circlotron where each stage is a single triode with plate impedance of R_{p} and voltage gain of μ is defined by the formula

$Z = R_p / (2 + \mu)$

The tubes best fitting the circlotron concept are triodes designed for use in power supplies as series regulators: 6080/6AS7, 6C33C, 6C19P. An amplifier with one 6AS7 dual triode per channel (R_{p} = 270 ohms, μ = 2) will have a Z of about 67 ohms—sufficient to drive most headphones. Driving loudspeakers requires paralleling output tubes, and in practice, V1 and V2 are not single triodes, but massive banks of paralleled triodes. Simple OTL amplifiers, for example Atma-Sphere M-60, employ 8 double triodes of 6AS7 type per channel; each continuously dissipates an average of 30 watts. Without feedback, this arrangement results in an output impedance of 6–8 ohms. It can be further lowered by applying global negative feedback or paralleling more output tubes. On the extreme end, Atma-Sphere MA-2 amplifier uses 20 6AS7 tubes per channel, with a continuous power consumption of 600 watts per channel (800 watts at maximum rated output of 220 watts, or a 27% maximum efficiency).

== Benefits and drawbacks ==
Perceived fidelity (quality) of audio reproduction is a hardly quantifiable, subjective measure that should be left to each individual listener's taste. Apart from audio fidelity, circlotron OTL have certain benefits versus asymmetrical OTLs (i.e. Futterman amplifier) and conventional, transformer-coupled amplifiers:

- Scalability. The same basic design can be easily scaled up or down by adding (removing) output tubes.
- Loudspeaker safety. Even when either V1 or V2 bank fails completely, direct current through speaker is limited to non-destructive values.
- Reliability. Failure in one triode (or a double-triode tube) can be offset by re-biasing the amplifier; it will continue operating, although at reduced maximum output and with increased even-order distortion caused by output stage asymmetry.
- Linear frequency response and fast transient handling. Absence of output transformer and global negative feedback extends full-power frequency response into hundreds of kilohertz. On the lower end of frequency scale, bass response is limited by power supply capacity and driver circuit, and can be easily extended below 1 hertz.

These benefits are at the cost of high power consumption and concomitant heat generation: minimal stereo power amplifier (e.g. Atma-Sphere S-30) continuously dissipates 400 watts, while practical low-impedance stereo setups approach 1 kilowatt, the power of a small electric heater.

Circlotrons, unlike minimalistic single-ended amplifiers, need to employ quite complex balanced input and driver stages delivering at least 100 V peak-to-peak voltage and able to drive relatively high capacitance loads (due to the number of paralleled power triodes and associated long wiring). The first requirement is typically solved with a long-tailed cascode stage (two or three double triodes). The second requirement is the need for two cathode followers inserted between the driver stage and the power stage. Both need a bipolar power supply, independent of the power stage power supplies, with power established before the power stage supply starts.
