= Western Electric (tube manufacturer) =

American tube manufacturer

Western Electric Export Corporation (or simply Western Electric) is a manufacturer of vacuum tubes and high end audio gear. Based in Rossville, Georgia, the company builds an ultra-premium version of the 300B electron tube. It traces its roots to 1872 with the Bell Telephone Company and the original Western Electric. The original AT&T-based company was shut down in 1984. The successor was started in 1995, when AT&T granted Charles G. Whitener (Westrex Corporation) a license to the trademark and intellectual property of the original Western Electric company. In January 2007, Western Electric announced the acquisition of the assets of former vacuum tube factory Ei Niš from Serbia. The company has announced it will manufacture vacuum tubes for musical instruments, such as electric guitars.

== 300B ==
Few factories make tubes of any kind as the market for these devices is small. Tubes have generally been replaced by transistors, which are smaller, much more efficient, produce less heat and are less expensive. However, there still exists a few markets for tubes, such as high end audio reproduction and many electric guitar amplifiers. The product line consists of solely the 300B, which was designed for use in telephone amplification in the 1930s. By the 1980s, they found use by audiophiles. Western Electric's tubes are marketed as "ultra-premium" products designed for audiophiles. In 2020, the price for a matched pair of these single-ended tubes was $1499, while a matched quad cost over twice as much.

== Guitar amplifier tubes ==
In March of 2022, Western Electric announced it would produce tubes for the guitar tube amplifier market, including the 6L6, EL34, 6V6, EL84, 12AX7, and others. At the time most nations had banned imports from Russia because of the 2022 Russian invasion of Ukraine. At the same time, Chinese manufacturing was being phased out, leaving only a single factory in Slovakia (JJ Electronic) as a ready source for these vacuum tubes. The existing 300B tubes are quite different from tubes used in guitar amps, however many parts like the base mounts are identical, as well as the glass being made from the same material.

Western Electric also completed a major expansion of their Georgia facility, a two-year undertaking that moved production to the Rossville location and expanded room for production. According to company sources, the jump from making 300B to these other models is not that big a step because of the use of similar materials. The company expects the American-made tubes to be more expensive than compatible tubes from Russia or China. It confirmed that it has no intention of expanding manufacture outside of the United States.

According to a Wired article from March, 2023 the first new U.S. made small signal tubes manufactured will be the type 12AX7.

== Other products ==
In 2022, Western Electric began production of the 91E amplifier system, employing the 300B tube in a single ended configuration. The amplifier is a high-end model designed for audiophiles, costing $15,000 or more. It can produce from 14 to 20 watts (at 8 ohms) per channel. This is considerably more than the standard 10w per channel from a typical 300B amplifier. Like Western Electric's other products, the amplifier is built in America.
