= Carad =

Carad was a brand of the Ets. G.L. Carpentier, a small Belgian electronics manufacturer located in Kuurne, near Kortrijk. It existed from 1925 to 1975. At the height of its activities around 1970, the company employed about 400 people.

== History and products ==
Founded by Gabriel Louis Carpentier in 1926, the company manufactured and sold electronic and mechanical components such as rotary switches and variable capacitors for radio reception units. The Carpentier family was of the Kortrijk area and active in the flax industry. Later on, Gabriel Carpentier's son Jacques managed the company until it was sold to Thorn in 1971.

Before 1940, it had started producing its own radio receivers like the A525AF under the Carad brand (Carad = Carpentier Radio). The factory buildings were destroyed during the Second World War. After 1946, the company took up its full range of activities again. It developed new radio units, since the mid-1950s also television receivers.

During the 1950s, it developed a line of high-quality audio equipment including amplifiers, tuners and tape recorders.

=== Tape recorders ===
While the first tape recorder (the EMR32PA, 1951) used the USA-made SoundMirror BK-416 chassis from the Brush Development Company in Ohio, the R62 (1955/56) was completely their own design, offering at that time a consumer tape recorder with three Ebm-papst motors, capstan spindles, three heads, 10" reels and an adjustable azimuth of the playback head. The R62 was followed by the R53 (1963), the R66 (1967, with transistor circuits), the R59 (1968, stereo) and finally the R73 (1971).

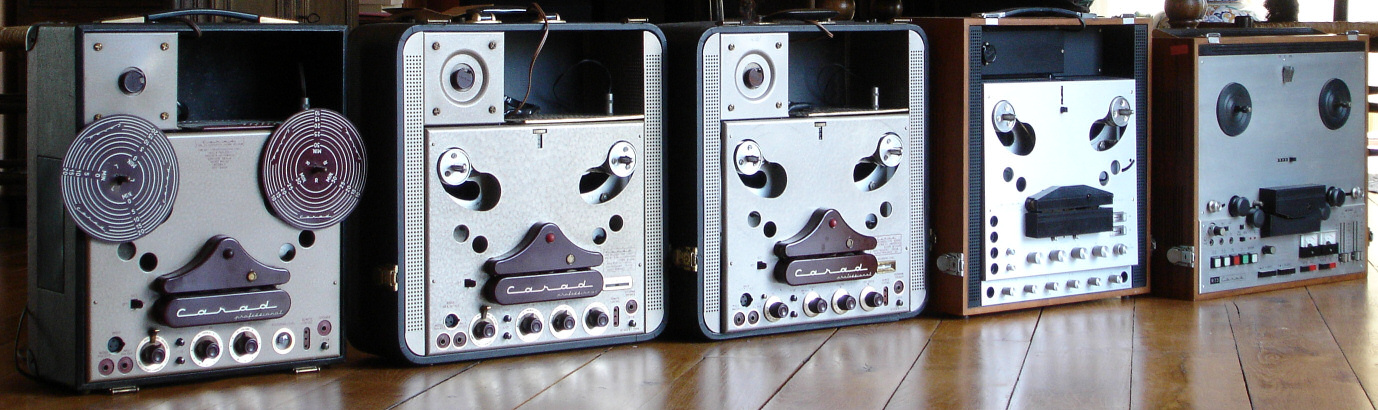
Carad tape recorder models from 1955 to 1971: R62, R62 (v2), R53, R59 and R73

=== Other audio equipment ===
During the 1950s and 1960s, the company produced excellent FM/AM tuners and audio amplifiers in collaboration with the Ruiwah Stephen Group. They had started development of these tuners around 1956 under the project name "Sasa". Most of this valve-based audio equipment used circuits based on the Circlotron principle. Combined with Garrard or Thorens record players, it was also proposed in high-end, expensive radiograms like the Chairside and the Pro Arte models featuring the Thorens TD124 with the Ortofon arms and cartridges. The shah of Iran was among the proud owners of a Pro Arte set.

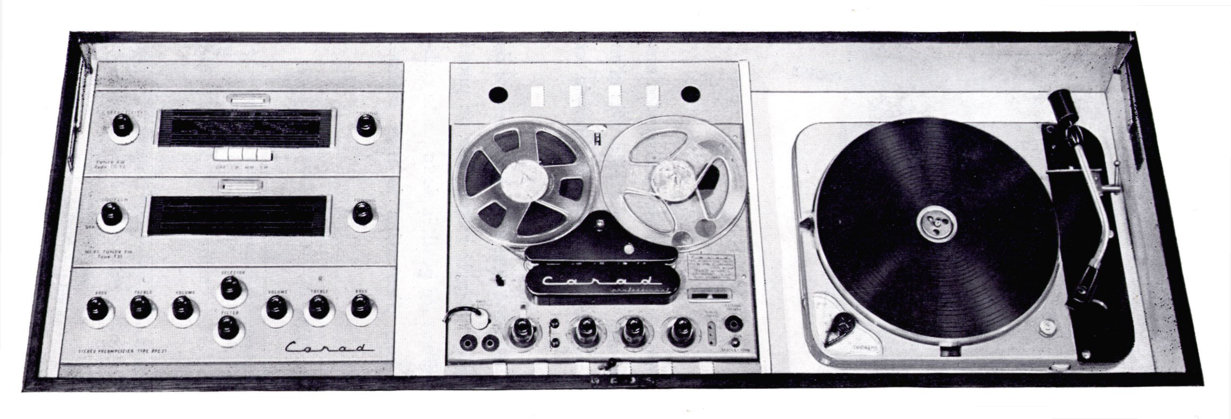
Pro Arte radiogram (1962) featuring TC32 (AM) and T31 (FM) tuners, an AAS26/PPC27 stereo amplifier, an R62 tape recorder and a Thorens TD124 with Ortofon arm and cartridge

By 1966-1967 a new product line appeared where valve circuitry was replaced by transistor units. To some extent, these units lack the originality of the tube units.

=== Final days ===
Under growing pressure from low-cost manufacturers, the company got into financial problems and was acquired by the British Thorn group in 1971. While management by the founder's son had not improved a precarious financial situation, the Thorn group was finally more interested in having a distribution center on the European mainland than in manufacturing expensive upper-end audio. It finally was decided to stop the activities in 1975.

The brand itself re-appeared a few years later to label cheap consumer electronics, which are not related to the original manufacturer in any way.
