= Valve transmitters =

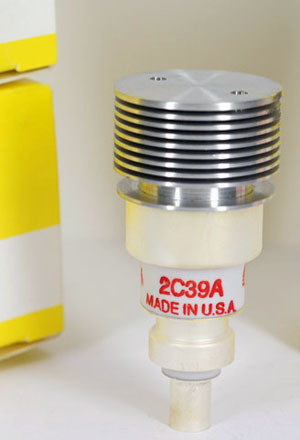
Transmitter tube Eimac 2C39A

A valve transmitter typically refers to a manufactured device that is used in industrial automation to convert signals related to a valve's operation (such as position, pressure, or level) into a standardised output signal for monitoring or control purposes. It can also mean a transmitter amplifier that has been built using vacuum valves or tubes, specifically within telegraphy and radiocommunication.

Most high power transmitter amplifiers are of valve construction because of the high power required.

== Anode circuits ==
Since valves are designed to operate with much higher resistive loads than solid state devices, the most common anode circuit is a tuned LC circuit where the anodes are connected at a voltage node. This circuit is often known as the anode tank circuit.

== Grid circuits ==
=== Active (or tuned grid) ===
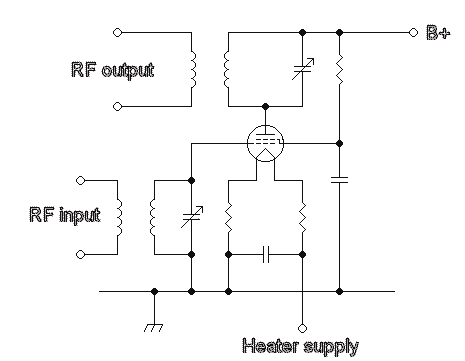
Simple tetrode based design using a tuned grid input

An example of this used at VHF/UHF could include the 4CX250B; an example of a twin tetrode would be the QQV06/40A. The tetrode has a screen grid which is between the anode and the first grid. This is grounded at the operating frequency, but carries a DC potential, normally 10 to 50% of the plate voltage. The screen grid serves to increase the stage gain while also providing shielding which increases the stability of the circuit by reducing the effective capacitance between the first grid and the anode.

For very high gain circuits, the shielding effect of the screen may not be sufficient to prevent all coupling from the plate back to the grid. Even a small amount of feedback may cause tuning difficulties and perhaps even self oscillation. Coupling of energy from the output back into the input can also occur due to poor circuit layout. It is therefore often necessary to add a neutralization circuit, which feeds some of the output signal back to the input with proper amplitude and opposite phase so as to cancel out the above-mentioned undesirable effects.

In common with all three basic designs shown here the anode of the valve is connected to an LC circuit to tune the plate circuit to resonance. Power may be coupled to the antenna via an additional inductive link as shown. More commonly modern circuits use a Pi network to resonate the plate circuit and match it to the antenna while also reducing harmonics.

=== How it works ===
For a fixed anode voltage the anode current of a triode can be described by the following equation

$$I_\mathsf{anode} = K_1 \cdot \left( E_\mathsf{grid} - N_1 \right)
+ K_2 \cdot \left( E_\mathsf{grid}^2 - N_2 \right)
+ K_3 \cdot \left( E_\mathsf{grid}^3 - N_3 \right)\ \ldots$$

For a tetrode the equation will be:

$$\begin{align}
I_\mathsf{anode} =
&~ K_{1\ \mathsf{grid} 1} \cdot \left( E_{\mathsf{grid} 1}   - N_{1\ \mathsf{grid} 1} \right)
+ K_{2\ \mathsf{grid} 1} \cdot \left( E_{\mathsf{grid} 1}^2 - N_{2\ \mathsf{grid} 1} \right)
+ K_{3\ \mathsf{grid} 1} \cdot \left( E_{\mathsf{grid} 1}^3 - N_{3\ \mathsf{grid} 1} \right)\ \ldots \\
+ &~ K_{1\ \mathsf{grid} 2} \cdot \left( E_{\mathsf{grid} 2}   - N_{1\ \mathsf{grid} 2} \right)
+ K_{2\ \mathsf{grid} 2} \cdot \left( E_{\mathsf{grid} 2}^2 - N_{2\ \mathsf{grid} 2} \right)
+ K_{3\ \mathsf{grid} 1} \cdot \left( E_{\mathsf{grid} 2}^3 - N_{3\ \mathsf{grid} 2} \right)\ \ldots
\end{align}$$

Note that because the second grid is further away from the cathode, the values of the constants K, for the second grid will be smaller than those for the first grid.

As the second grid (screen grid) in a tetrode is maintained at a constant potential the equation for the tetrode can be reduced back to that of the triode as long as the screen grid is kept at the same potential.

In short the anode current is controlled by the electrical potential (voltage) of the first grid. A DC bias is applied to the valve to ensure that the part of the transfer equation which is most suitable to the required application is used.

The input signal is able to perturb (change) the potential of the grid, and this in turn will change the anode current. Another term for the anode in a valve is the plate so hence on many designs the anode current is named the plate current.

In the RF designs shown on this page between the anode and the high voltage supply (known by convention as B+) is a tuned circuit. This tuned circuit has been brought to resonance, and in a class A design can be thought of as a resistance. This is because a resistive load is coupled to the tuned circuit. In audio amplifiers the resistive load (loudspeaker) is coupled via a transformer to the amplifier. In short the load formed by the loudspeaker driven via the transformer can be thought of as a resistor wired between the valves anode and B+.

As the current flowing through the anode connection is controlled by the grid, then the current flowing through the load is also controlled by the grid.

One of the disadvantages of a tuned grid compared to other RF designs is the neutralization is required.

== Passive grid ==
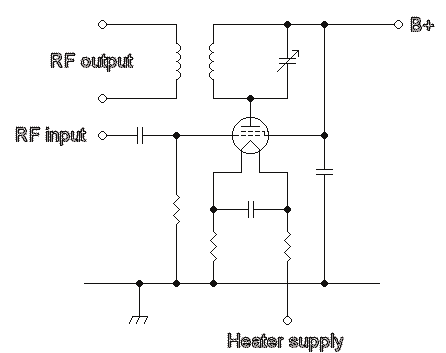
simple tetrode based design using a passive grid input

An example of a passive grid used at VHF/UHF frequencies include the 4CX250B; an example of a twin tetrode would be the QQV06/40A. The tetrode has a screen grid which is between the anode and the first grid, the purpose of the screen grid is to increase the stability of the circuit by reducing the capacitance between the first grid and the anode. The combination of the effects of the screen grid and the damping resistor often allow the use of this design without neutralization.

The signals come into the circuit through a capacitor, they are then applied to the valve's first grid directly. The value of the grid resistor determines the gain of the amplifier stage. The higher the resistor the greater the gain, the lower the damping effect and the greater the risk of instability. With this type of stage good layout is less vital.

Passive grid design is ideal for audio equipment, because audio equipment must be more broadband than RF equipment. A RF device might be required to operate over the range 144 to 146 MHz (1.4% of an octave) while an audio amp might be required to operate over the range 20 Hz to 20 kHz, a range of three orders of magnitude.

=== Advantages ===
- Stable, no neutralizing required normally
- Constant load on the exciting stage

=== Disadvantages ===
- Low gain, more input power is required
- Less gain than tuned grid
- Less filtering than tuned grid (more broadband), hence the amplification of out of band spurious signals, such as harmonics, from an exciter is greater

== Grounded grid ==
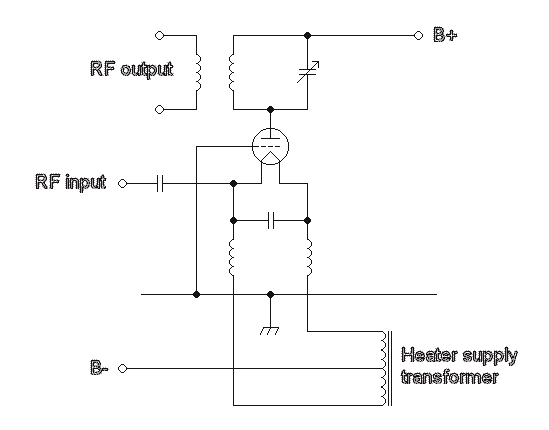
Simple triode based design using cathode input

This design uses a triode. The grid current drawn in this system is higher than that required for the other two basic designs. Because of this, valves such as the 4CX250B are not suitable for this circuit. This circuit design has been used at 1296 MHz using disk seal triode valves such as the 2C39A.

The grid is kept at ground potential, and drive is applied to the cathode through a capacitor. The heater supply must be isolated with great care from the cathode as unlike the other designs, the cathode is not connected to RF ground. The cathode may be at the same DC potential as the grid if a valve such as the 811A (zero bias triode) is used, otherwise the cathode must be positive with respect to the grid to provide proper bias. This may be done by putting a zener diode between the cathode and ground, or by connecting a suitable power supply to the cathode.

=== Advantages ===
- Stable, neutralizing not normally required
- Some of the power from exciting stage appears in the output (no phase inversion)

=== Disadvantages ===
- Very low gain, much more input power is required
- The heater must be isolated from ground with chokes
