= Shunt regulated push-pull amplifier =

A shunt regulated push–pull amplifier is a Class A amplifier whose output drivers (transistors or more commonly vacuum tubes) operate in antiphase. The key design element is the output stage also serves as the phase splitter.

The acronym SRPP is also used to describe a series regulated push–pull amplifier.

== History ==
The earliest vacuum tubes based circuit reference is a patent by Henry Clough of the Marconi company filed in 1940. It proposes its use as a modulator, but also mentions an audio amplifier use.

Other patents mention this circuit later in a slightly modified form, but it is not widely used until 1951, when Peterson and Sinclair finally adapted and patented the SRPP for audio use. Variety of transistor based versions appeared after the 1960s.
