= 833A =

Type of vacuum tube

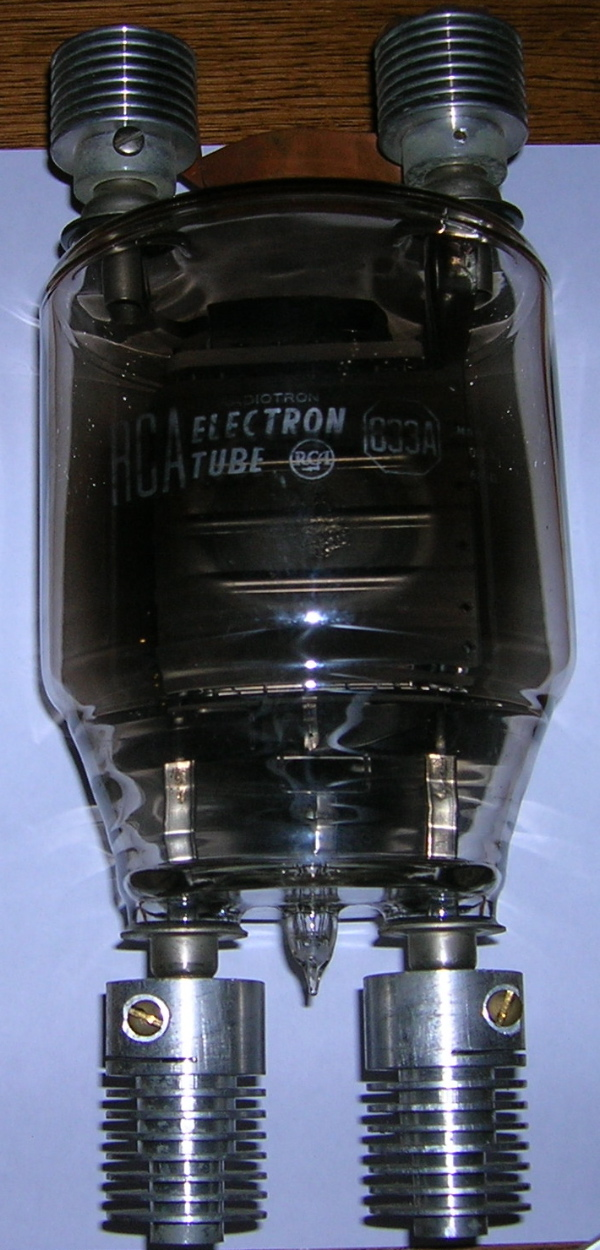
An RCA Radiotron 833A with heat sink connectors

The 833A is a vacuum tube constructed for medium power oscillator or class B or C amplifier applications. It is a medium-mu power triode with 300 watts CCS or 350 watts ICAS anode dissipation. The long grid and anode leads, plus high internal capacitance, limits this tube to 15-30 MHz maximum frequency. Being medium mu, it is normally not suitable for grounded grid operation.

== Specifications ==
The 833A is a large tube of the type sometimes known as a "cookie jar" tube, with the envelope nominally measuring 116.8 mm (4.60 in.) in diameter and 219.2 mm (8.63 in.) in height. The 833A contains a thoriated tungsten filament rated at 10 volts and 10 amps. A pair of 833A's with adequate forced air cooling can deliver 1000 watts of CCS RF power operating as a class C amplifier plate modulated stage.

A pair of tubes used in a class B modulator can deliver 1800 watts of "peak" AF power in ICAS service with speech, or 1600 watts in CCS service with music or high duty cycle operation. Two 833A's are capable of approximately 800 watts sine wave power in a class B audio amplifier or modulator. This assumes approximately 58% efficiency, 1400 watts input, and 300 watts per tube anode dissipation. The anode normally shows a dull to medium red color when operating at full power.

The tube is supported solely by its two filament posts. These posts are keyed with the F1 and F2 connection having a diameter of 9.5 mm (0.375 in) and 11.1 mm (0.438 in) respectively.

The 833A was preceded by the 833.

== Characteristics ==
Amplification factor, 35
Anode to Grid capacitance, 6.3 pF
Anode to Filament capacitance, 8.5 pF
Filament to Grid capacitance, 12.3 pF

Values for two 833s working class B as an audio amplifier or modulator.
Va max, 3 kV
Ia max, 500 mA (Averaged over one cycle of signal waveform per 833.)
Pin max, 1.125 kW (Averaged over one cycle of signal waveform per 833. This is the total input power to each 833 at maximum drive.)
Pa max, 300 W (Averaged over one cycle of signal waveform per 833. This is the maximum anode dissipation and at this power level the anode reaches a temperature of about 800 °C, and glows red hot.)
Vg1 max, -70 V
A.F. grid to grid voltage, 400 V Pk.
No signal D.C. anode current, 100 mA
Max signal D.C. anode current, 750 mA
Load resistance, (Per 833), 2.375 kΩ
Effective load resistance, (anode to anode), 9.5 kΩ
Max signal driving power, 20 W avg.
Max output power, 1.65 kW avg.

Values per 833 working class B as an R.F. amplifier with a maximum modulation factor of 1.0.
Va max, 3 kV
Ia max, 400 mA
Pin max, 450 W (This is the total input power to each 833 at maximum drive.)
Pa max, 300 W (This is the maximum anode dissipation and at this power level the anode reaches a temperature of about 800 °C, and glows red hot.)
Vg1 max, -70 V
Peak R.F. grid voltage, 90 V.
D.C. anode current, 150 mA
D.C. grid current, 2 mA
Driving power, 10 W appx.
Output power, 150 W appx.

Values per 833 working class C as an R.F. amplifier with a maximum modulation factor of 1.0.
Va max, 2.5 kV
Ia max, 400 mA
Pin max, 850 W (This is the total input power to each 833 at maximum drive.)
Pa max, 200 W (This is the maximum anode dissipation.)
Vg1 max, -500 V, nom, -300v
Peak R.F. grid voltage, 460 V.
D.C. anode current, 335 mA
D.C. grid current, 75 mA
Driving power, 30 W appx.
Output power, 630 W appx.

Values per 833 working class C as an R.F. amplifier or oscillator, (C.W. conditions, unmodulated, 50% Duty cycle.)
Va max, 3 kV
Ia max, 500 mA
Pin max, 1.25 kW (This is the total input power to each 833 at maximum drive.)
Pa max, 300 W (This is the maximum anode dissipation.)
Vg1 max, -500 V, nom, -200 V
Peak R.F. grid voltage, 360 V.
D.C. anode current, 415 mA
D.C. grid current, 55 mA
Driving power, 20 W appx.
Output power, 1 kW appx.

Grid voltages measured with respect to the midpoint of the directly heated cathode.
80% efficiency at A.F., dropping to 60% at 100 MHz when used as an amplifier.

== Applications ==
The 833A was widely used in small (1 kW class) AM broadcast transmitters. Typically, a pair of 833As would be used in the final amplifier, plate modulated by another pair. It was also used in small induction heaters. This tube has also been used by hobbyists to construct a vacuum tube Tesla coil.

== See also ==
- List of vacuum tubes
