= 300B =

Electron amplifier vacuum tube

300B dimensions in mm

In electronics, the 300B is a directly-heated power triode vacuum tube with a four-pin base, introduced in 1938 by Western Electric to amplify telephone signals. It measures 6.4 in (16 cm) high and 2.4 in (6.1 cm) wide, and the anode can dissipate 40 watts thermal. In the 1980s it began to be used increasingly by audiophiles in home audio equipment. The 300B has good linearity, low noise and good reliability; it is often used in single-ended triode (SET) audio amplifiers of about eight watts output. A push–pull pair can output 20 watts.

As of 2022 manufacturers of 300B and other tubes of similar characteristics included EkspoPUL (Electro Harmonix brand), ELROG, Emission Labs - EML, JJ Electronic, KR Audio, TJ FullMusic, Hengyang Electronics (Psvane brand), Linlai, Takatsuki Electric and Western Electric. Prices for new 300B tubes ranged from US$175 to $2,000 per matched pair.

Western Electric (tube manufacturer), a small, privately owned company in Rossville, Georgia resumed production of the original 300B in 2018 using the original, 1938 manufacturing standards on a modernized assembly line housed at the Rossville Works.

== See also ==
- List of vacuum tubes
