= Ottawa Tool Library =

Coordinates: 45.3759°N 75.7500°W

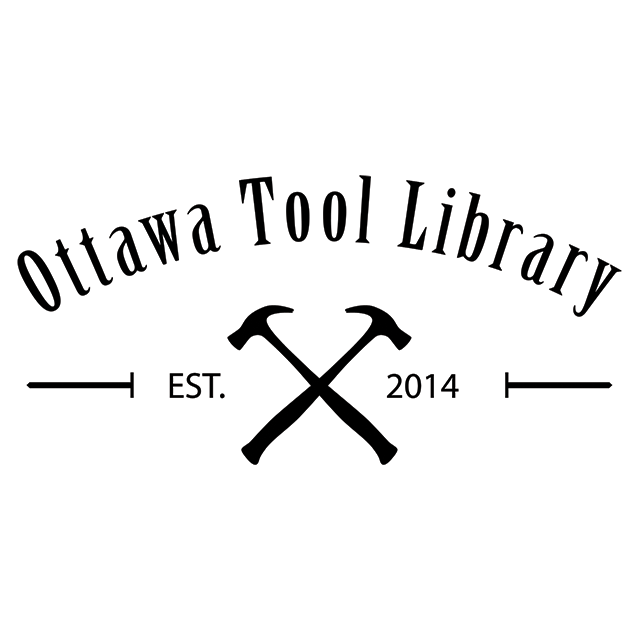
- Location: 877A Boyd Ave Ottawa, Ontario, Canada
- Established: 2014

Collection
- Size: 301+

Access and use
- Members: 200+

Other information
- Director: Bettina Vollmerhausen
- Employees: 1
- Website: Ottawa tool library

Ottawa Tool Library (OTL) is a not for profit tool lending public library system based in Ottawa, Ontario, Canada. Tool libraries lend specialized tools for both experienced and inexperienced community members who are interested in home repair, maintenance, building projects, community projects, gardening and landscaping as well as cooking. The OTL offers annual, short-term, group and gift memberships.

== History ==
The Ottawa Tool Library (OTL) is a project of The Society for Social Ingenuity (SSI), a registered Canadian non-profit organization based in Ottawa. The OTL was cofounded by Bettina Vollmerhausen and Frederic Sune. The goal is to put tools in the hands of people who want them to do their projects. The OTL opened at 250 City Centre, in 2014, and moved to 877A Boyd Ave. in 2021.

== Governance ==
The OTL is governed by a Board which is responsible for the strategic planning, financial stability, and oversight of staff and volunteers.

== Services ==
=== Collections ===
The tool library adapted Share Starter's free "Tool Library Starter Kit" which includes start up guidelines, frequently asked questions, and sample documents. The library uses "Local Tools" from "myTurn.com, PBC", a web-based inventory management system to track loans to Tool Library members and to automatically display tool availability online. The library has over 2,000 specialized tools to lend to members with all skill levels welcomed. The inventory of equipment includes automotive, bicycle, carpentry and woodworking, electrical and soldering, home maintenance, metalworking, plumbing, re-modelling, electronics, garden, kitchen, hand, air and power tools, although no gas-powered tools. The OTL is seeking cash donations as well as donations of hand tools, power tools, garden tools and kitchen tools.

=== Training ===
The Ottawa Tool Library offers workshops open both to Tool Library members and the public on tool related skills and projects. For example, in the Intro to Power Tools workshop, participants build a planter box; and similarly in other hands-on workshops.

== Mission ==
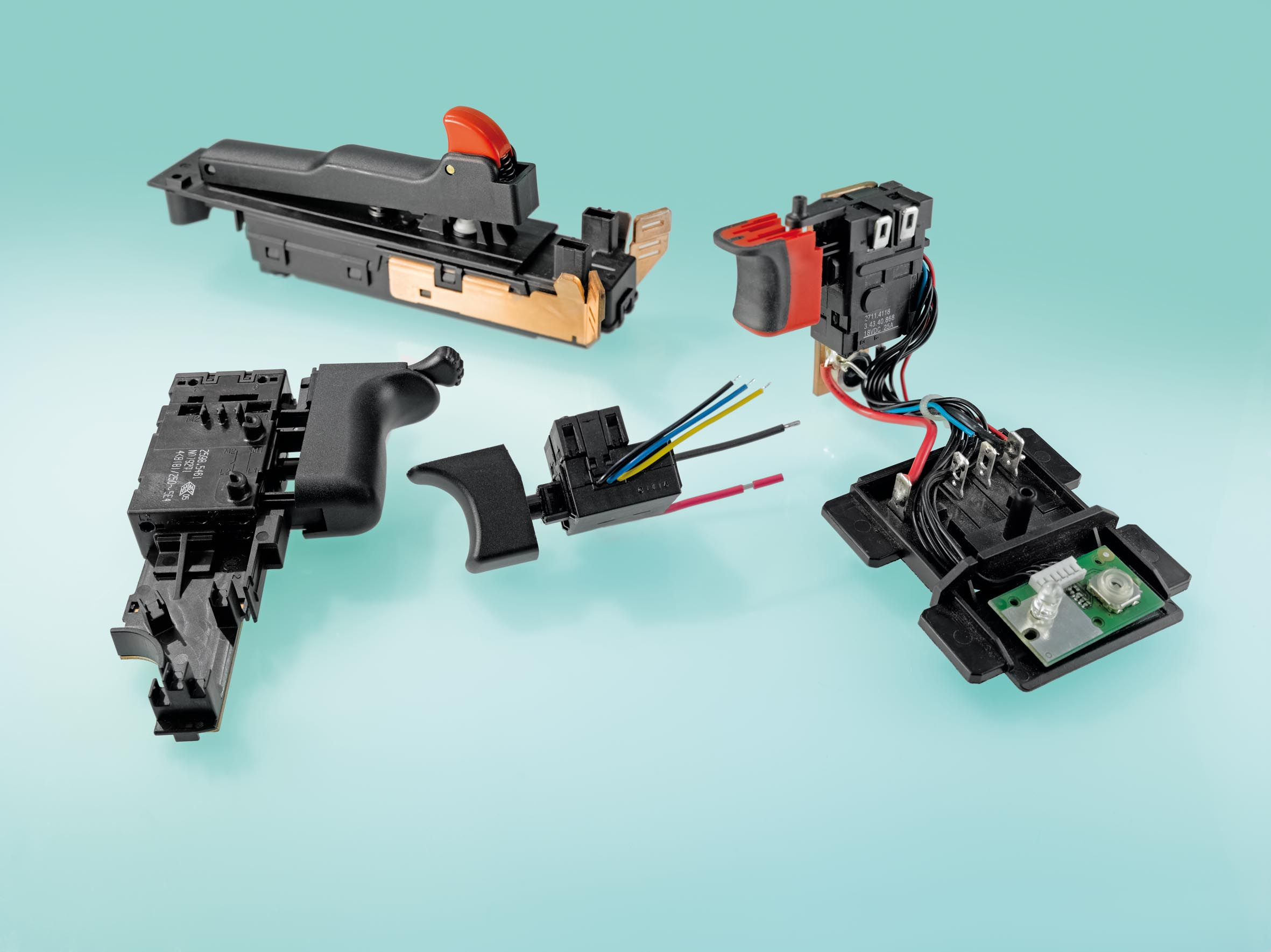
Power Tools

=== Tool library ===
The Tool library performs the following main tasks:

- Tool Lending: to members for use in personal projects, community improvement events, and special events.
- Tool Advocacy: for the complete and timely return of all borrowed tools, to guarantee the long-term sustainability of available inventory. Staff also seeks compensation for lost tools and tools returned late.
- Tool Maintenance: performing routine maintenance and repairs on all equipment to ensure good condition and to extend the lifespan of the inventory. This function is typically performed by volunteers and community service workers.

== Location ==
- Ottawa Tool Library is located at 877A Boyd Ave., Ottawa. Tool donations can be borrowed from this location, and volunteers are welcomed to help keep this community resource going in Ottawa. Volunteer opportunities include: assisting members, providing tool and equipment knowledge, instructing workshops and tool maintenance.

== See also ==
- List of tool-lending libraries
