= Output transformerless =

Audio power amplifier type

OTL tube amplifier Model H3 as designed by Julius Futterman in 1965 (long-term exposure)

Output transformerless (OTL) is a type of vacuum tube audio power amplifier, which omits an output transformer for the purpose of greater linearity and fidelity. Conventional vacuum tube amplifier designs rely upon an output transformer to couple the amplifier's output stage to the loudspeaker. Instead, OTLs use one of two primary methods for output stage coupling: direct coupling (DC) or capacitive coupling (AC).

== Additional definitions ==
There is some contention with respect to applying the broader term "OTL" to capacitively coupled designs and variants. The need to delineate these designs from their directly coupled counterparts has led to the informal adoption of several additional terms, including:

- OCL (output capacitor-less) — distinguishes OTL designs lacking an output coupling capacitor (directly coupled)
- DC-OTL — denotes a directly coupled design; synonymous with OCL
- AC-OTL — denotes an AC (capacitively) coupled design
- Z-OTL — denotes a small class of variants, based on US Patent 5,612,646. While strictly speaking not transformerless, it avoids a bulky audio frequency transformer and its frequency restrictions, and essentially modulates the high impedance output of a vacuum stage with a high frequency carrier so it can pass through a small multi-winding high frequency transformer to be applied to a low impedance speaker load.

== Differentiation of designs ==
=== By coupling methods: direct versus capacitive coupling and variants ===
Background: The output coupling method of a vacuum tube amplifier generally serves two basic purposes:

- Negation (blocking) of high DC voltages in the output section to prevent a damaging flow of direct electric current through the loudspeaker.
- Matching the relatively high output impedance of the conventional vacuum tube to the relatively low impedance of conventional loudspeakers.

==== Direct coupled designs ====
In direct coupled OTL designs, both the necessary blocking of DC and matching of impedances are accomplished, respectively, through the topology of the amplifier's output section and the selection of vacuum tube types with sufficiently low impedance to allow effective power transfer to the loudspeaker. Typically, direct coupled OTL amplifiers will have a user-adjustable DC offset control, which allows the user to trim off any residual DC voltage residing at the amplifier's output terminals prior to operation. Servo-controlled variants also exist.

==== Capacitively coupled designs ====
Like the direct coupled designs, capacitively coupled designs rely on the selection of tube types with a sufficiently low impedance to effect the transfer of power to the loudspeaker. However, unlike direct coupled designs, capacitively coupled designs do not have inherent DC blocking by virtue of their topology. Instead, DC voltage in the output section is blocked by an output coupling capacitor - typically a large-value (3000-6000μF) electrolytic capacitor - which is interposed between the amplifier's output section and the loudspeaker.

=== By output section topology ===
There are several practical approaches to the design of an OTL amplifier's output section, each with their own respective strengths and weaknesses. While certain topologies lend themselves well to direct coupling, others are more suitable for capacitive coupling. The various designs in service may thus be grouped based upon their common output section topologies. Common topologies include:

- Futterman type and variants (examples: Counterpoint, Fourier, Julius Futterman, New York Audio Labs (NYAL), Prodigy Audio Labs., Silvaweld et al.)
- Circlotron type (examples: Atma-Sphere Music Systems, Joule Electra, Tenor et al.)
- Totem-pole type (many examples, including SEPP and the White Cathode Follower)
- H-bridge type (few examples)
- Single-ended type (examples: Transcendent Sound SE-OTL, various low-power headphone amplifiers)

== OTL applications ==
OTL power amplifiers for driving loudspeakers require multiple tubes in parallel to obtain the required drive current. An alternative is to use high impedance loudspeakers (now rare, but Philips produced 400 and 800 ohm speakers, such as type number: AD4690/M800).

OTL headphone amplifiers are more common, as typical headphones require the current that a single pair of tubes can provide.

OTL designs are sometimes also used when driving long communication or interconnect cables, when a predictable and low output impedance is required.
