= Single-ended triode =

Vacuum tube electronic amplifier that uses a single triode to produce an output

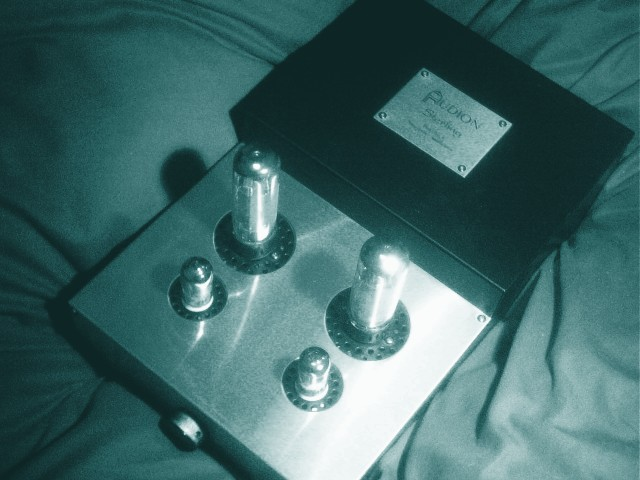
A SET tube audio amplifier

A single-ended triode (SET) is a vacuum tube electronic amplifier that uses a single triode to produce an output, in contrast to a push–pull amplifier which uses a pair of devices with antiphase inputs to generate an output with the wanted signals added and the distortion components subtracted. Single-ended amplifiers normally operate in Class A; push–pull amplifiers can also operate in Classes AB or B without excessive net distortion, due to cancellation.

The term single-ended triode amplifier is mainly used for output stages of audio power amplifiers. The phrase directly heated triode single-ended triode amplifier (abbreviated to DHT SET) is used when directly heated triodes are used.

There are also single-ended tetrode, beam tetrode/beam power tube/kinkless tetrode, and pentode amplifiers with the same functionality and similar circuitry; e.g. this Mullard design.

== Audio power amplifiers ==
A typical triode audio power amplifier will have a driver that provides voltage gain, coupled to a triode (like 2A3 and 300B) or a pentode or kinkless tetrode such as EL34 or KT88 connected as a triode, connected to the loudspeaker through an audio transformer in a common cathode arrangement. The triode is biased to Class A operation by applying a suitable negative bias voltage to its input control grid (see diagram), or by raising the cathode potential with biasing components.

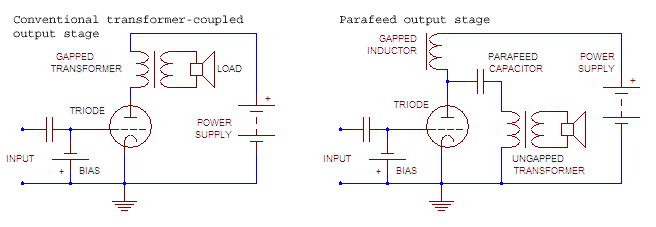

In traditional SET amp, the direct current of output triode (from 30 mA for triode-strapped 6V6 to 250 mA for 6C33C) flows continuously through the primary winding of a transformer. This requires inserting a gap in the transformer core to prevent core saturation by DC current; adding a gap decreases primary inductance and limits bass response; the inductance and bass response can be restored by using a larger transformer than if the DC were not present.

An alternative schematic, parafeed amplifier, solves bandwidth problem by blocking direct current from output transformer (which does not need to be gapped, thus improving its bass response). Power supply is reconfigured into a constant current source, usually with a massive, high-inductance anode choke (gapped inductor), so there is little, if any, gain in cost and weight of magnetic components.

A stereo class A single-ended design with KT88 kinkless tetrodes which produces 15W of output power per channel, and 5W when triode-connected, is the Antique Sound Lab MG-SI15DT. By comparison a pair of the same tubes in class AB push–pull claim to output about 50W at 1% distortion (higher powers at high distortion are quoted for guitar amplifiers).

=== Benefits ===
- Simplicity. An audio amplifier cannot be much simpler than a Class A single-ended.
- Overall low harmonic distortion with small signals. By nature Class A amplifiers do not suffer from crossover distortion.
- Small roaming of anode bias current does not do anything catastrophic.

=== Drawbacks ===
- Low efficiency. All Class A amplifiers consume full power regardless of the signal amplitude.
- Second harmonic distortion at high signal level is a normal feature of single-ended amplifiers. (Not all consider this a drawback. Some audio enthusiasts find even order harmonics to be pleasing to the ear and more natural sounding.)
- Compared to the amplifier's low power the output transformer is heavy and expensive.

== Speaker matching ==
Historically, negative feedback in single ended pentode amplifiers was quite common (for example, the Mullard 3-3 design built around EL84). Today negative feedback is less popular with SET amplifiers, with many having no overall feedback loop. Their frequency response, limited by transformer passband, is then modulated by irregularities in loudspeaker impedance. This, and the very low attainable power levels (3 Watts for 2A3 to 20 Watts for 6C33C), requires careful matching of amplifier to speakers; selection is usually limited to high-efficiency loudspeakers with a sensitivity exceeding 90 dB/Watt.

== Audio quality ==
Single-ended triode (SET) amplifiers are considered a classic design among certain audiophiles and have achieved a cult status because of their alleged excellent midband performance (argued to be the most important part of the audio spectrum in music reproduction), "musicality" and "directness". This perceived high sonic quality is mainly attributed to the simplicity and minimalistic approach of the circuits involved and the triode amplifying tubes that are typically used.

On the other hand, the legitimacy of branding single-ended triode amplifiers as adequate for Hi-Fi purposes is debated, as from a technical standpoint, SET amplifiers are considered to be generally far inferior to subsequent (and more common) push–pull tube designs or solid-state amplifiers: SET designs require output transformers which are able to cope with a strong DC component in the signal, which causes them to have worse performance in regard to frequency response, distortion and efficiency (although the latter is not generally a priority for most SET enthusiasts, or audiophiles in general). Furthermore, as SET amplifiers have a relatively high output impedance, it is hard to couple them effectively to a loudspeaker which hasn't been designed especially to be driven by a high output impedance amplifier, as this will cause the amplifier to be much more sensitive to the loudspeaker's impedance characteristics across the spectrum, resulting in coloration.

In general, the configuration will usually provide higher measured distortion performance compared to high feedback amplifiers. This distortion is predominantly second harmonic which is not unpleasant to the ear (the second harmonic for an A on the musical scale at 440 Hz is 880 Hz which is, obviously, also an A i.e., the same note just an octave higher), but by definition their high THD figures make SET amplifiers inaccurate. In a push pull amplifier this second harmonic distortion is cancelled in the output transformer. Several percent THD is not unusual at full power output, but will be much lower at normal music levels. Some builders and users have concluded that while global feedback reduces distortion across the harmonic range, it also reduces the dramatic dynamics associated with a SET amplifier and the highly efficient speaker needed to enjoy a low power amplifier, but this is also strongly debated.

Apart from the field of hi-fi amplification, SET amplifiers are well regarded by some in the guitar world precisely due to their distortion characteristics, which may considered desirable in the context of musical instrument amplification, as their aim isn't accuracy but expressiveness and harmonic complexity.

== Estimating power output for a Class A1 amplifier from valve specifications ==
In class A, in order to produce a full sine wave, the tube must be exactly half-way on. Therefore, the maximum current swing is +/- 50%. No actual amplifier will ever achieve this.

Obtain the following parameters:

- Pa (or P[a+g2] for pentodes) (in watts).
- Rp in triode (in ohms),
- load resistance (Rl) (in ohms) (which may vary depending on the design.)

Compute maximum theoretical power output by P[ot] = Pa / 2.

While the valve can be driven all the way to shut-off fairly easily, the maximum current will be limited by the internal resistance of the valve as the grid reaches the voltage of the cathode and is not impeding electron flow. For this reason, valves that have a low Rp can yield more power in class A1 than other valves with similar Pa ratings.

Next, compute P[o] = P[ot] * (1 - Rp/Rl) to obtain an estimate of the maximum obtainable output power.

Deduct 10% from this figure to account for the relatively heavy distortion encountered as the valve approaches cut-off.

== Class A2 ==
Class A2 amplifiers can overcome a high Rp by driving the grid positive with respect to the cathode. Because this makes the grid a secondary anode, it too will draw current from the cathode while accelerating the remaining electrons towards the plate. Grid currents can place extreme demands on the driving circuitry, sometimes requiring as much as 8 watts input for larger tubes such as the 211.

== See also ==
- Valve sound
- High-end audio
- List of vacuum tubes
