= Phase splitter =

A BJT phase splitter

A phase splitter is a device that separates a signal into multiple phases (or polarities).

The term is most often applied to amplifiers that produce two "balanced" voltage outputs: of equal amplitude but opposite polarity (i.e. 180 degrees phase difference), but sometimes is used to refer to the generation of quadrature signals (i.e. differing by 90 degrees). The term is not used for logic circuits producing complementary outputs, nor applied to differential amplifiers that have balanced inputs and outputs.

== Methods ==
- using a unity gain inverting amplifier to provide an inverted copy of its input signal;
- a split-load amplifier (also known as a "cathodyne" or "concertina phase splitter", especially in the context of vacuum tube implementations); a transistor implementation is shown in the diagram;
- a differential pair amplifier can form a phase splitter in two ways:
  - if the shared emitter (or cathode or source, for triode vacuum tubes or FETs respectively) connection is fed from something approximating a constant current sink (for example, a relatively large value resistor with a significant voltage drop, i.e. a long-tailed pair) then only one input (base, grid or gate) need be driven with signal; the shared connection will vary in voltage with half the amplitude of the input, becoming an input to the second device (which acts as a common-base (or common-grid or common-gate) amplifier). The sum of the currents in each of the collectors (or anodes or drains) will be almost constant, hence an increase in one will be matched by an equal decrease in the other, giving rise to equal, but opposite phase, voltages on the outputs. This technique was first described by O.H. Schmitt.
  - if the shared emitter (or cathode or source) resistor is relatively small, total current will vary with signal, and the signal will not be evenly split across both outputs, so a fraction of the first device's output will have to be fed to the second device's base or grid or gate to balance the amplitudes at the two outputs. Effectively, the second device is acting now as an inverting unity-gain amplifier.
- A transformer with two equal secondary windings can be used (often with an amplifier stage to drive the primary).

== Uses ==
- driving an amplifier in a balanced topology, such as push-pull or H bridge.
- driving balanced transmission lines or balanced audio cables;
- supplying voltages in an oscilloscope to pairs of deflection plates in the CRT;
- producing anti-phase signals used in some filter designs, such as all-pass filters to approximate quadrature signals used in SSB signal generation or old quadraphonic decoders.
