= Twystron =

Technology

A twystron is a type of microwave-producing vacuum tube most commonly found in high-power radar systems. The name refers to its construction, which combines a traveling wave tube, or TWT, with a klystron, producing a tw-ystron. The name was originally a trademark of Varian Associates, its developer, and was often capitalized. In recent times has become a generic term for any similar design.

The twystron amplifies a source signal using a conventional klystron, which consists of a series of cylindrical resonant chambers fed with the source signal. An electron gun at one end of the tube produces electrons that flow through holes in the centers of the resonators. As they pass through the holes, the signal within the resonator causes the electrons to "bunch up", a process known as velocity-modulation. The resulting electron beam is an amplified version of the original signal. In a conventional klystron, this signal is then captured and used as the output.

In the twystron, the output instead flows into a TWT for further amplification. The advantage of this approach is that while the multi-resonator klystron is an efficient amplifier, its bandwidth is reduced as one adds additional resonators, which makes high-power klystrons have a relatively low bandwidth generally less than 10% of the design frequency. In contrast, the TWT has a wider bandwidth response but are generally very long. By combining a klystron with a TWT, the result is a relatively compact device with improved bandwidth; typical twystrons have bandwidth up to 15% of the design point.

The device was developed by Albert La Rue and Rodney Rubert in the early 1960s and was quickly adopted by many radar designs in order to improve frequency agility and thereby improve performance against radar jamming systems. The twystron was generally replaced by the extended interaction klystron and solid state amplifiers.
