= Rudolf Kompfner =

Austrian-born inventor, physicist and architect

- Born: May 16, 1909; Vienna, Austria
- Died: December 3, 1977 (aged 68); Stanford, California, United States
- Education: Oxford University, D.Phil.
- Awards: Duddell Medal and Prize (1955); Stuart Ballantine Medal (1960); IEEE Medal of Honor(1973); National Medal of Science (1974)
- Scientific career
- Fields: Electrical engineering

Rudolf Kompfner (May 16, 1909 – December 3, 1977) was an Austrian-born inventor, physicist and architect, best known as the inventor of the traveling-wave tube (TWT).

== Life ==
Kompfner was born in Vienna to Jewish parents. He was originally trained as an architect and after receiving his university degree in 1933 he moved to England (due to the rise of anti-Semitism), where he worked as an architect until 1941. He had a strong interest in physics and electronics, and after being briefly detained by the British at the start of World War II he was recruited to work in a secret microwave vacuum tube research program at the University of Birmingham. While there, Kompfner invented the TWT in 1943. After the war he became a British citizen, continued working for the Admiralty as a scientist, and also studied physics at the University of Oxford, receiving his D.Phil. in 1951.

In 1965, he received an honorary doctorate from the Vienna University of Technology.

== Patents ==
=== 1957 ===
- Traveling Wave Tube Amplifier (issued August 27, 1957)
- Traveling Wave Tube (issued October 29, 1957)
- Electron Beam System (issued November 5, 1957)

=== 1958 ===
- Traveling Wave Tube (issued May 13, 1958)
- Electron Beam System (issued October 21, 1958)
- Non-reciprocal Wave Transmission (issued November 11, 1958)

=== 1959 ===
- Traveling Wave Tube (issued January 6, 1959)
- Direct View Storage Tube (issued March 24, 1959)
- Backward Wave Tube (issued June 16, 1959)
- Traveling Wave Tube (issued July 14, 1959)
- Apparatus Utilizing Slalom Focusing (issued August 11, 1959)
- Non-reciprocal Wave Transmission Device (issued November 3, 1959)
- Backward Wave Amplifier (issued December 8, 1959)

=== 1960 ===
- Non-reciprocal Elements in Microwave Tubes (issued January 26, 1960)
- Coaxial Couplers (issued February 16, 1960)
- Pulse Coincidence Detecting Tube (issued April 19, 1960)
- Electron Gun for Slalom Focusing Systems (issued May 31, 1960)
- High Efficiency Velocity Modulation Devices (issued August 16, 1960)
- Traveling Wave Tube (issued October 4, 1960)

=== 1961 ===
- Low Noise Amplifier (issued February 14, 1961)
- High Frequency Amplifier (issued February 21, 1961)
- Backward Wave Tube (issued May 23, 1961)
- Elastic Wave Parametric Amplifier (issued December 5, 1961)

=== 1962 ===
- Parallel High Frequency Amplifier Circuits (issued February 15, 1962)
- Scanning Horn-Reflector Antenna (issued February 13, 1962)
- Microwave Filter (issued June 26, 1962)
- Broadband Cyclotron Wave Parametric Amplifier (issued August 28, 1962)
- High Frequency Generator (issued December 4, 1962)

=== 1964 ===
- Traveling Wave Light Modulator (issued May 12, 1964)
- Artificial Scattering Elements for Use as Reflectors in Space Communication Systems (issued September 29, 1964)
- Detector for Optical Communication System (issued October 27, 1964)

=== 1965 ===
- Beam Collector with Auxiliary Collector for Repelled or Secondarily-Emitted Electrons. (Issued 6 /8, 1965)
- Antenna System (issued July 20, 1965)
- Sinusoidal-Shaped Lens for Light Wave Communication (issued December 21, 1965)
- Transmission of Light Waves (issued December 21, 1965)

=== 1966 ===
- Optical Maser Amplifier (issued May 24, 1966)
- Antenna System (issued September 13, 1966)
- Triple Element S-Lens Focusing System (issued November 15, 1966)

=== 1967 ===
- Spherical Reflector Elastic Wave Delay Device with Planar Transducers (issued May 2, 1967)

=== 1969 ===
- Intracavity Image Converter (issued July 8, 1969)

=== 1970 ===
- Receiving Antenna Apparatus Compensated for Antenna Surface Irregularities (issued January 13, 1970)
- Anti-Doppler Shift Antenna for Mobile Radio (issued March 24, 1970)
- Multiple-Pass Light-Deflecting Modulator (issued March 31, 1970)
- Multiple-Pass Light-Deflecting Modulator (issued March 31, 1970)
- Optical Waveguide (issued April 14, 1970)
- Time Division Multiplex Optical Transmission System (issued April 14, 1970)
- Digital Light Deflecting Systems (issued June 2, 1970)
- Method and Apparatus for Obtaining 3-Dimensional Images from Recorded Standing Patterns (issued July 14, 1970)
- Optical Heterodyne Receiver with Pulse Widening or Stretching (issued September 22, 1970)
- Light Communication System with Improved Signal-to-Noise Ratio (issued October 6, 1970)

=== 1977 ===
- Method of and Apparatus for Acoustic Imaging (issued March 15, 1977)
