= Nuvistor =

Late vacuum tube design designed to compete with transistors

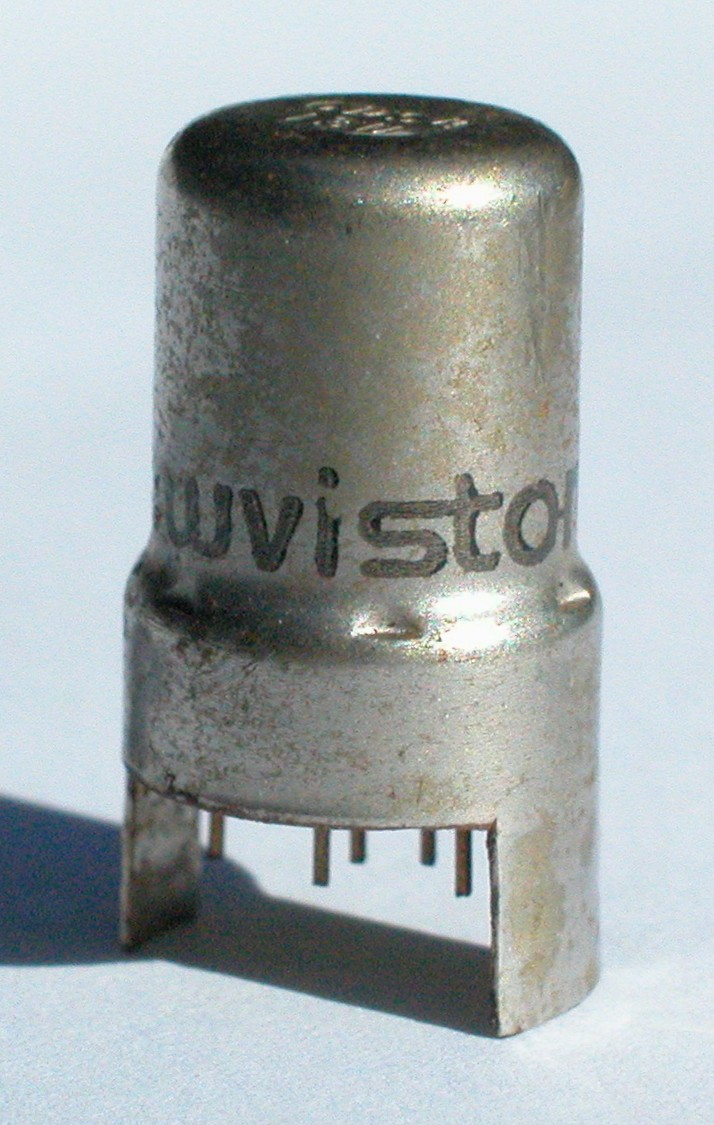
RCA 6DS4 "Nuvistor" triode vacuum tube, ca. 20 mm high and 11 mm in diameter

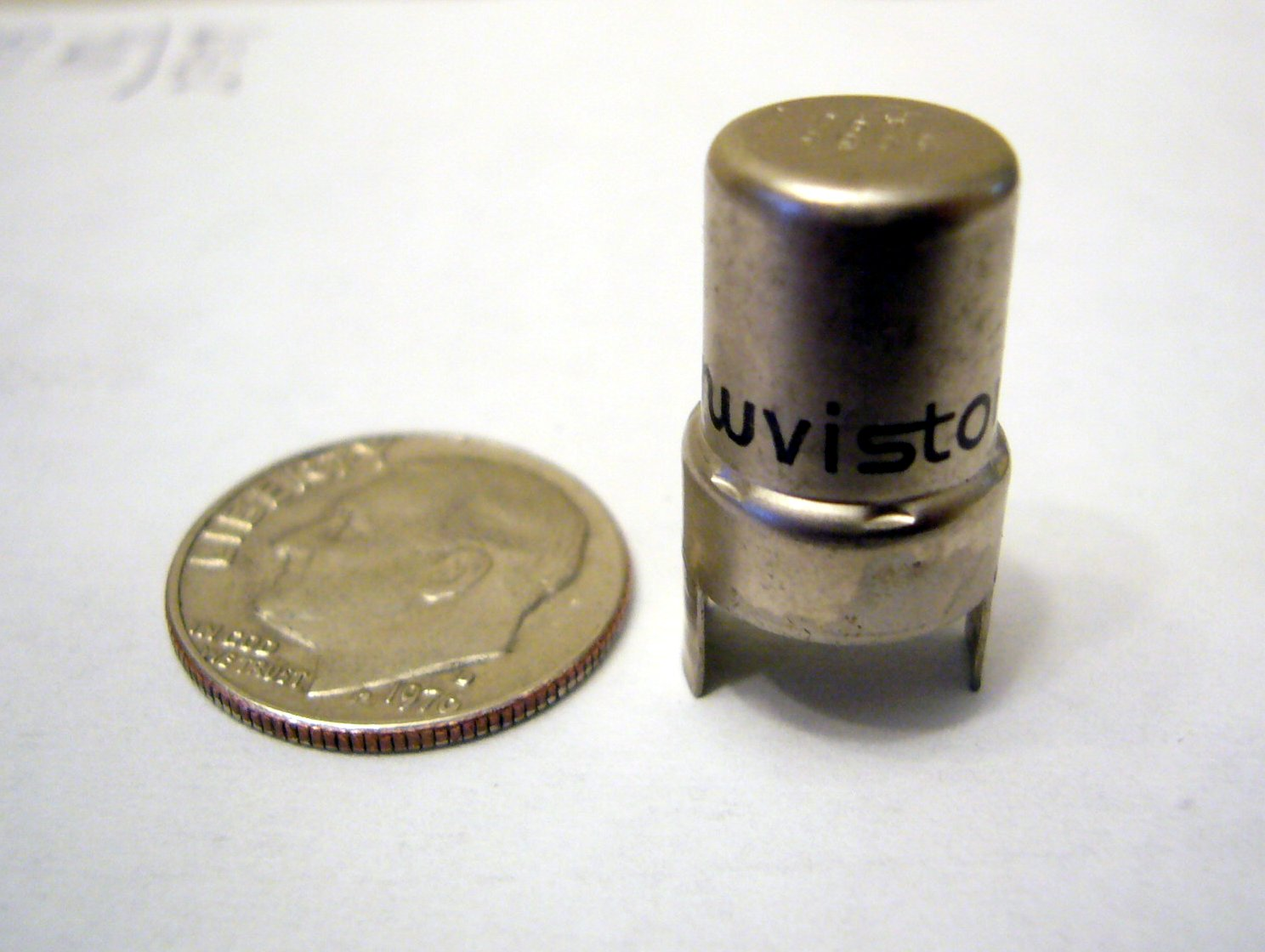
Nuvistor with U.S. dime for scale

The nuvistor is a type of vacuum tube announced by RCA in 1959. Nuvistors were made to compete with the then-new bipolar junction transistors, and were much smaller than conventional tubes of the day, almost approaching the compactness of early discrete transistor casings. Due to their small size, there was no space to include a vacuum fitting to evacuate the tube; instead, nuvistors were assembled and processed in a vacuum chamber by simple robotic devices. The tube envelope is made of metal, with a ceramic base. Triodes and a few tetrodes and pentodes were made; nuvistor tetrodes were taller than triodes.

Nuvistors are among the highest-performing small-signal radio-frequency receiving tubes, largely due to low stray capacitance and inductance due to their small size. They have excellent VHF and UHF performance, and low noise figures, and were widely used throughout the 1960s for low-power applications in television sets (beginning with RCA's "New Vista" line of color sets in 1961 with the CTC-11 chassis), radio receivers and transmitters, audio equipment, and oscilloscopes. RCA discontinued their use in television tuners in late 1971.

Nuvistor applications included the Ampex MR-70, a studio tape recorder whose entire electronics section was based on nuvistors, and studio-grade microphones from that era, such as the AKG/Norelco C12a, which employed the 7586. It was also later found that, with minor circuit modification, the nuvistor made a sufficient replacement for the obsolete Telefunken VF14M tube, used in the Neumann U47 studio microphone. Tektronix used nuvistors in several of its high end oscilloscopes of the 1960s, before replacing them later with solid-state JFETs. Nuvistors were used in the Ranger space program and Russian-made ones (with soldered pigtail leads, more reliable than sockets) were used in the Soviet MiG-25 fighter jet, presumably to radiation-harden the fighter's electronics; this was discovered following the defection of Viktor Belenko.

== Pin layouts ==
Nuvistor sockets have a standardized layout based on four imaginary concentric circles with the pins laid out at 60 degree angles from the center point of the base. The metal shell has two fins that extend below the base; the larger of these two fins is the key position. Sockets can accommodate up to 12 pins, but usually only five or six are used.

Pins 1, 2 and 3 are assigned to the outermost circle, with Pin 1 located 60 degrees clockwise of the key fin. Pin 2, which is in line with the small fin, is 120 degrees clockwise of Pin 1. Pin 3 is 120 degrees clockwise of pin 2. For triodes, these pins (usually just Pin 2) are the plate/anode connection. For tetrodes, one of these pins is the screen grid connection and the plate/anode has a top cap connection.

Pins 4, 5 and 6 are assigned to the next circle. Pin 4 is in line with the key fin. Pin 5 is 120 degrees clockwise of Pin 4 and the key fin. Pin 6 is 120 degrees clockwise of Pin 5. The pins in this circle (usually pin 4) connect to the control grid.

Pins 7, 8 and 9 are assigned to the next circle. They are in the same lines as Pins 1, 2 and 3 and also increase in order going clockwise. These pins (usually pin 8) connect to the cathode.

Pins 10, 11 and 12 are assigned to the innermost circle. They are in the same lines as Pins 4, 5 and 6 and also increase in order going clockwise. These pins (usually Pins 10 and 12) connect to the heater.

Base 12AQ -- which is used by most triodes, including 6CW4 and 6DS4 -- is the most common connection layout. The connections are:

- Pin 2 - Plate/anode
- Pin 4 - Grid
- Pin 8 - Cathode
- Pins 10 and 12 - Heater

Base 12AS is the tetrode layout. The connections are:

- Pin 2 - Grid 2
- Pin 4 - Grid 1
- Pin 8 - Cathode
- Pins 10 and 12 - Heater
- Top cap - Plate

== Types ==
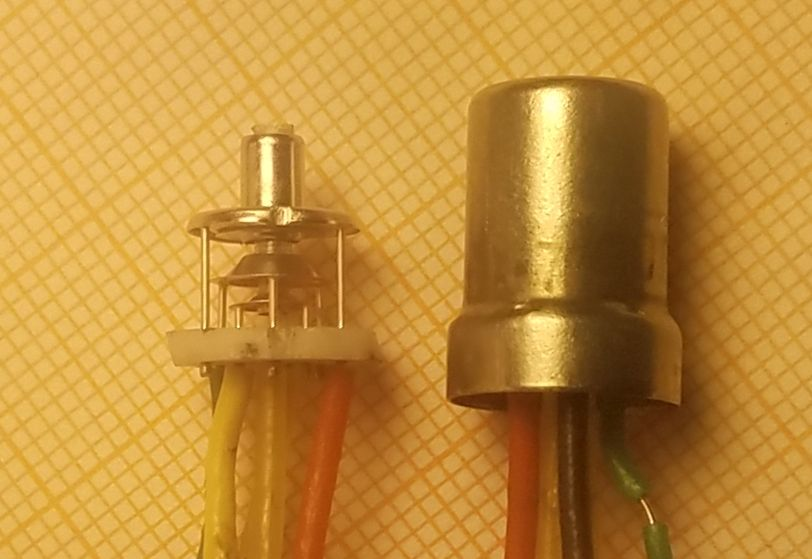
Nuvistor triode 6С52Н. Full (right), without case (left), with flying leads. USSR, 1970s.

- 7586 - First one released, medium mu triode (amplification factor: 31 to 35)
  - 7895 - 7586 with higher mu (amplification factor: 64)
  - 8393 - medium mu triode, equivalent of 7586 except heater is 13.5 volts at 60 mA, used in Tektronix equipment.
- 7587 - Sharp cutoff tetrode (Anode is top located)
- 8056 - triode for low plate voltages
- 8058 - triode, with plate cap & grid on shell, for UHF performance
- 6CW4 - high mu triode, with a 6.3 volt / 135 milliampere heater. Most common Nuvistor type in consumer electronics. Also used in VHF amateur radio and marine radio equipment. (amplification factor: 65)
  - 2CW4 - Same as type 6CW4, but with a 2.1 volt / 450 milliampere heater. Most commonly used in television receivers with series heater strings
  - 13CW4 - same as 6CW4, but with 12.6 Volt / 60 milliampere heater. Often used in VHF radio equipment powered by 12 volt storage batteries and generators.
- 6DS4 - remote cutoff 6CW4, with a 6.3 volt / 135 milliampere heater. Most commonly used in RCA color television receivers as an RF amplifier in tuners with transistor mixers and local oscillators (amplification factor: 63)
  - 2DS4 - same as 6DS4, but with a 2.1 volt / 450 milliampere heater. Most commonly used in television receivers with series heater strings
- 6DV4 - medium mu, intended as UHF oscillator, shell sometimes gold plated (amplification factor: 35)
- Soviet types (some types may have long solder-in leads)
  - 6П37Н-В (Latin alphabet: 6P37N-V) - wire-ended power tetrode
  - 6C51H (6S51N) - Similar to 7586
  - 6C52H (6S52N) - Same as 7895
  - 6C53H-В (6S53N-V) - wire-ended triode
  - 6C62H (6S62N) - High-mu (90) triode intended to receive weak RF signals
  - 6C63H (6S63N) - triode

== Dissection of a nuvistor triode tube ==
| Parts of a small nuvistor triode | Pictures |
|---|---|
| 7586 nuvistor triode. Two lugs (one large and one small) adjacent to pins 2 and 4 locate the tube in its socket, which is shown alongside. | |
| 7586 nuvistor triode. Twelve pins protrude through the ceramic base, some of which are long and form the connections to the heater, cathode, grid and anode electrodes. These short pins support the internal structure, along with the long ones. | |
| The metal envelope has been removed. View of the tube base, anode or plate and support pins. | |
| View of the tube base, anode or plate and support pins. Note that there are no mica spacers used to support and separate internal structures, as in normal tubes. | |
| The anode has been removed. The vertically oriented, mesh wire electrode is the control grid. | |
| The control grid has been removed. The vertically oriented electrode is the cathode. The indirectly heated cathode surrounds the heater. The electron emitting portion of the cathode is the white-colored oxide coating, typically barium oxide or strontium oxide. | |
| The cathode has been removed. The heater is tungsten wire coated with a refractory dielectric material of high thermal conductivity. | |
