= William C. Brown =

American electrical engineer (1916–1999)

- Born: May 22, 1916
- Died: February 3, 1999 (aged 82)
- Occupation: Engineer

William C. Brown (May 22, 1916 – February 3, 1999) was an American electrical engineer who helped to invent the crossed-field amplifier in the 1950s and also pioneered microwave power transmission in the 1960s.

Brown received his BSEE from Iowa State University in 1937, and his MSEE from the Massachusetts Institute of Technology in 1941. He joined Raytheon in 1940 and began work on their magnetron microwave amplifier products. By 1952 his work on adapting magnetron principles to create a new broadband amplifier resulted in the 'Amplitron', today known more commonly as a crossed-field amplifier (CFA). In 1961 Brown published the first paper proposing microwave energy for power transmission, and in 1964 he demonstrated on Walter Cronkite's CBS Evening News a microwave-powered model helicopter that received all the power needed for flight from a microwave beam.

Between 1969 and 1975 Brown was technical director of a JPL-Raytheon program that beamed 30 kilowatts over a distance of 1-mile (1.6 km) at 84% efficiency. He continued to make important contributions to this emerging technology until his retirement from Raytheon in 1984.

== See also ==
- Wireless power transmission
