= Andrew V. Haeff =

Russian electrical engineer

Andrew (Andrey) Vasily Haeff (12 January 1905 – 16 November 1990) was a Russian electrical engineer. Born in Moscow on 12 January 1905, Haeff's family fled to Harbin, China, when he was fifteen years old. He studied electrical and mechanical engineering at the Russian Polytechnic Institute in Harbin, graduating in 1928 and emigrating to the United States to study at the California Institute of Technology (Caltech). At Caltech, Haeff was awarded his MSc in 1929 and his PhD in 1932, with a thesis on an ultra-high frequency oscillator he later used in his invention of the traveling-wave tube amplifier.

In 1934, Haeff left Caltech to work for RCA's research and development team, where he invented the inductive output tube in 1939. With the United States' entry into the Second World War in 1941, Haeff joined the United States Naval Research Laboratory as a consulting physicist, helping with the development of radar and inventing a pulse jammer. At the war's conclusion, he stayed on at the Naval Research Laboratory as head of the Vacuum Tube Research Section, inventing the electron-wave tube and the "memory tube" - a cathode ray tube capable of temporarily storing data, later eclipsed by the Williams tube but used in the Tektronix 4014 computer terminals. In 1950, Haeff was the first recipient of the IEEE's Harry Diamond Memorial Award "For his contribution to the study of the interaction of electrons and radiation, and for his contribution to the storage tube art".

Haeff joined the Hughes Aircraft Company in 1950 to lead the Electron Tube Laboratory, where he continued producing memory and travelling-wave tubes and invented the electron-stream amplifier tube and resistive-wall amplifier with Charles Birdsall. The Electron Tube Laboratory was merged with Hughes' other research teams in 1954, becoming the Hughes Research Laboratories, with Haeff as their director. He left in 1961, exhausted, and became an independent inventor and consultant, creating a plasma containment device, a volumetric measuring device, and predicting laser-based scanning. He formally retired in 1975, and died at home on 16 November 1990.

== Bibliography ==
- Bromberg, Joan Lisa (1991). The Laser in America, 1950-1970. MIT Press. ISBN 0262023180.
- Copeland, Jack; Haeff, Andre (2015). "Andrew V. Haeff: Enigma of the Tube Era and Forgotten Computing Pioneer". IEEE Annals of the History of Computing. 37 (1). IEEE Computer Society: 67–74. doi:10.1109/mahc.2015.2. ISSN 1058-6180. S2CID 38662458.
