= Extended interaction oscillator =

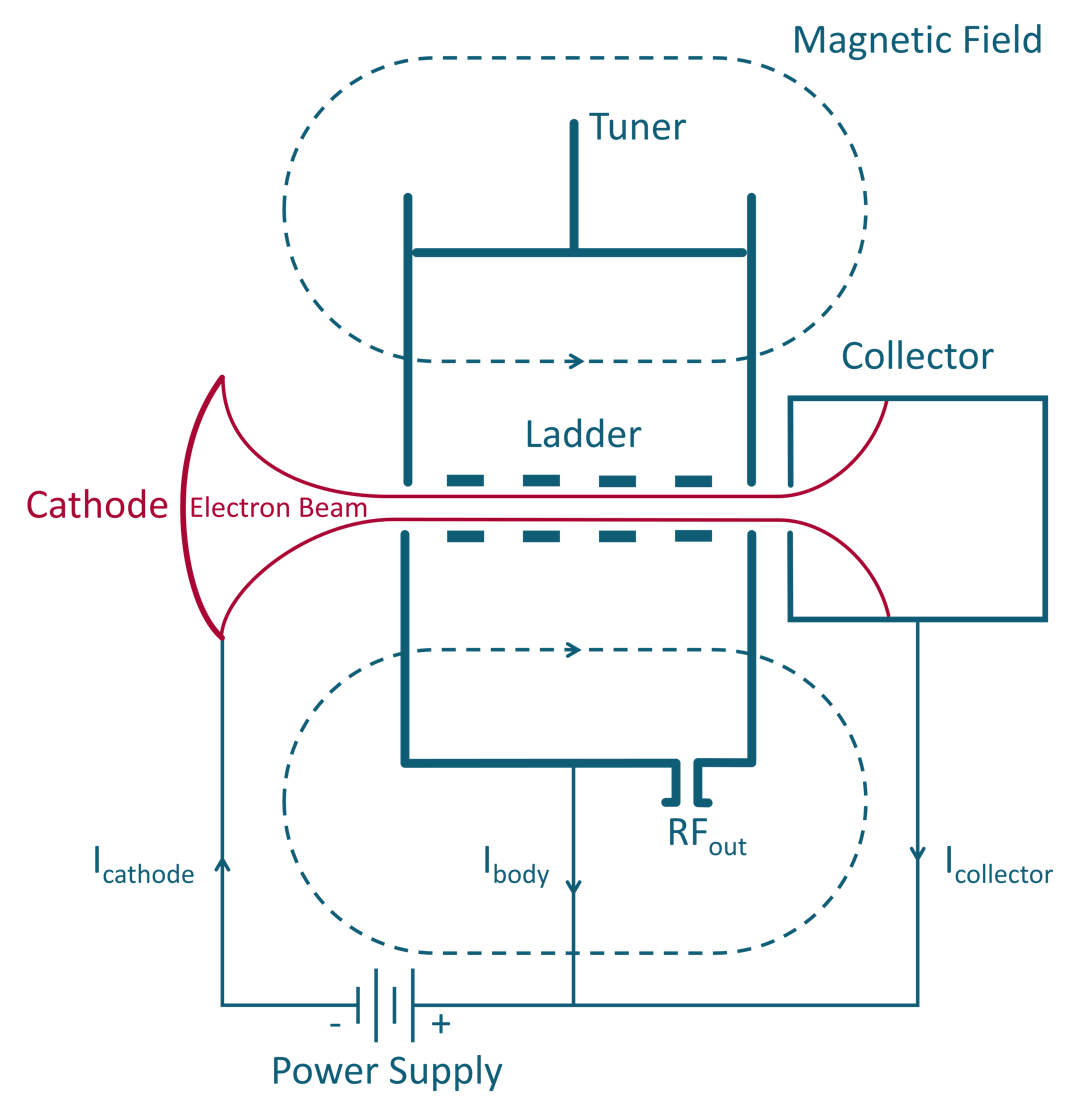
Extended Interaction Oscillator (EIO) diagram

The extended interaction oscillator (EIO) is a linear-beam vacuum tube designed to convert direct current to RF power. The conversion mechanism is the space charge wave process whereby velocity modulation in an electron beam transforms to current or density modulation with distance.

The tubes contain a single resonator. The complete cavity is a rectangular box containing a ladder-like structure through which the electron beam passes. Such a cavity has a large number of resonances but in the resonant mode used, large RF fields are developed in the gaps between the rungs. The phase advance from gap to gap is selected in such a way that an electron sees the same field at every gap, and it is described as being synchronous. In this context, the same field means a field of the same phase but not necessarily the same magnitude.

An electron beam which enters an RF excited cavity with approximately synchronous velocity will receive cumulative velocity modulation at each gap. After some distance into the resonator, repeatedly accelerated electrons will be catching up with electrons repeatedly decelerated, and bunches will form. These bunches will have a velocity close to the beam velocity. If the electron velocity is somewhat greater than synchronous, the bunches will start to cross gaps when the field is retarding, rather than zero. When this happens, the electrons are slowed; their lost energy is gained by the cavity and sustained oscillations become possible. As the velocity of the beam entering the cavity is increased further, more energy is transferred to the cavity and the frequency of oscillation rises somewhat. Eventually, however, the bunches punch through the retarding fields and oscillations cease abruptly. Reducing the beam velocity (voltage) will cause the tube to resume oscillation. However, it is necessary to reduce the beam velocity below the value at which oscillations ceased before oscillation will start again. This phenomenon is known as hysteresis and is similar to that observed in many reflex klystrons.

The frequency change which occurs as the beam voltage is raised is referred to as electronic tuning, and is typically 0.2% of the operating frequency measured from half power to cessation of oscillation. For larger frequency changes mechanical tuning is used which is obtained by moving one wall of the cavity. The moveable wall is, in fact, a piston which can be moved in a tunnel whose cross-section is that of the wall which it replaces. The range of mechanical tuning is usually limited by parasitic resonances which occur when the oscillating frequency and the frequency of one of the many other cavity resonances coincide. When this happens, serious loss is introduced, often enough to suppress oscillation completely. Typically, a mechanical tuning range of 4% can be obtained but greater ranges have been demonstrated.

Apart from the resonant cavity, the Extended Interaction Oscillator is very similar to more conventional klystrons. An electron gun produces a narrow beam of electrons which is maintained at the required diameter by a magnetic field while it passes through the RF section. Thereafter, the beam enters a relatively field-free region where it spreads out and is collected by an appropriately cooled collector. Many of these oscillators have electrically isolated anodes and in these cases, the voltage between the cathode and anode determines the tube current which in turn determines the maximum power output.
