= 845 (vacuum tube) =

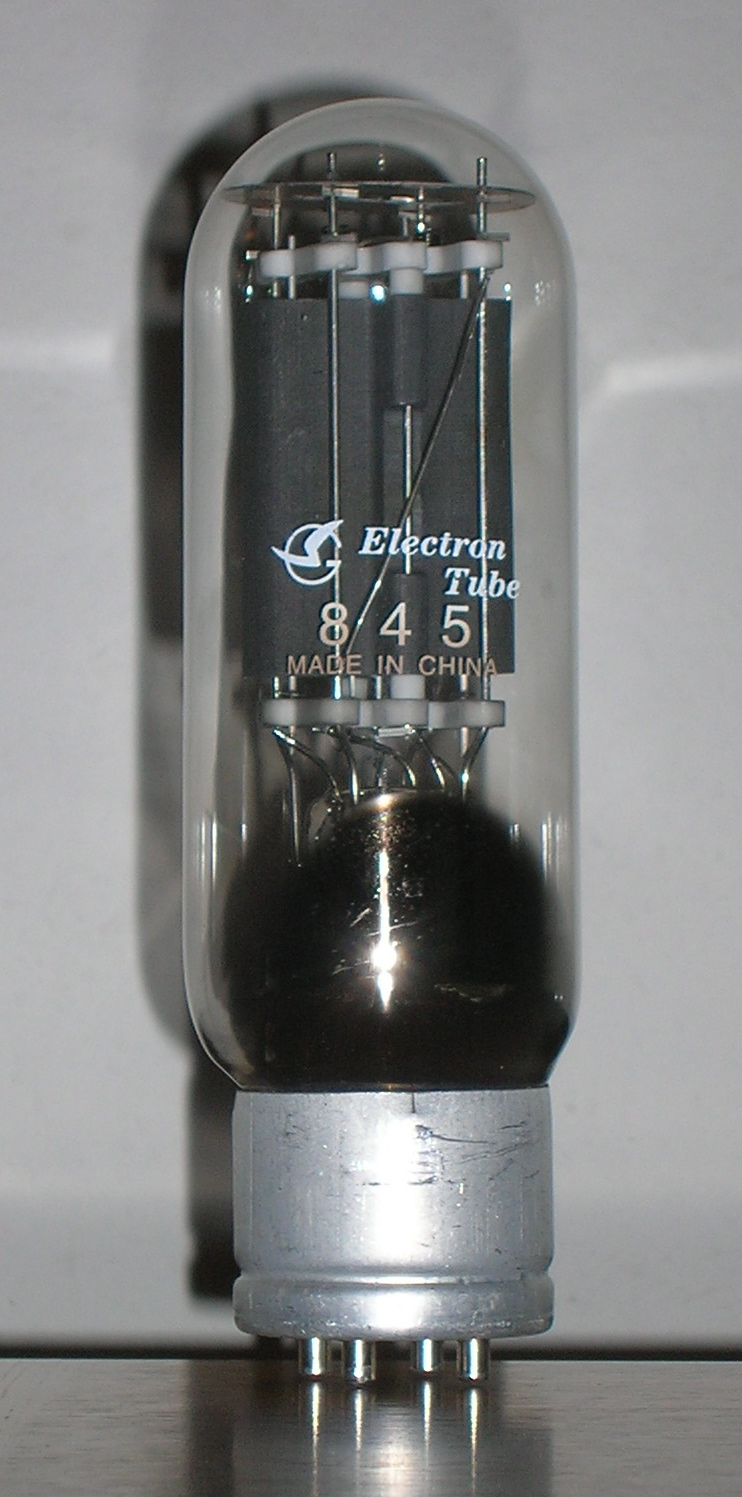
A modern Chinese-made 845 tube

The 845 power triode is a radio transmitting vacuum tube which can also be used as an audio amplifier and modulation tube. Typically, the plate is machined from solid graphite in order to accommodate high power dissipation (up to 100 watts) and voltage. Some current production 845 tubes have metal plates.

The 845 tube has a bayonet mount and thoriated filaments which glow like lightbulbs when powered up. The glass envelope is about 2-5/16" in diameter and 6 inches tall, with the a total tube height of about 7-7/8 inches. It was first released by RCA in 1931. It saw extensive use in RCA AM radio transmitters
