= Crossed-field amplifier =

Vacuum tube used in transmitters

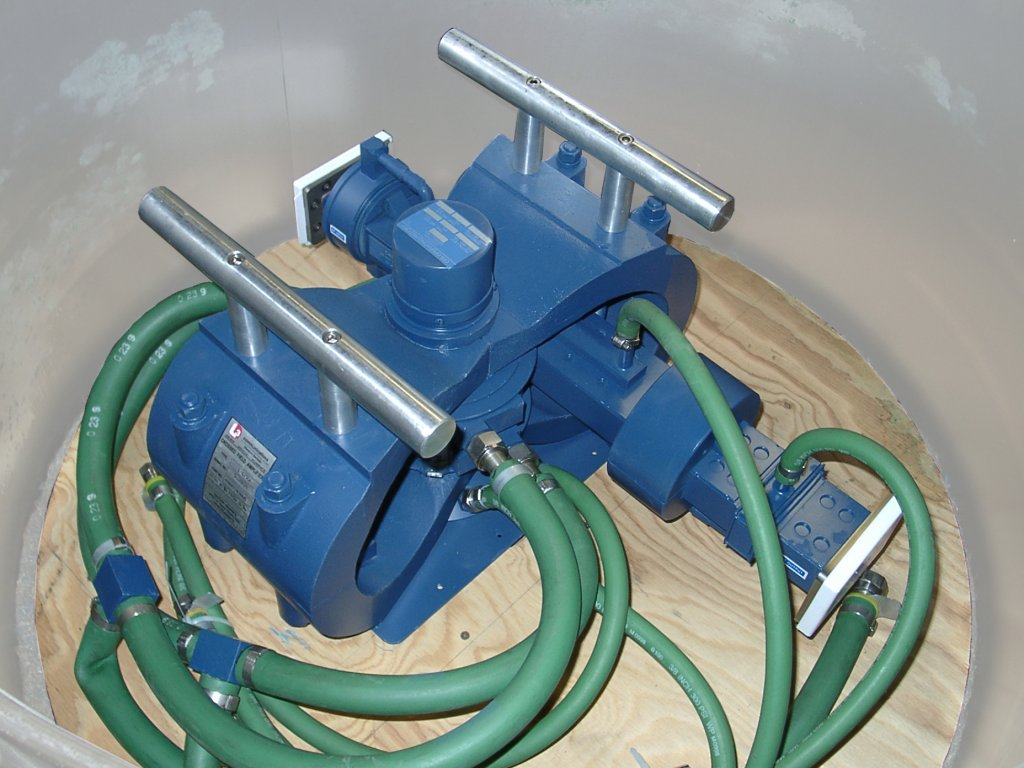

A crossed-field amplifier (CFA) is a specialized vacuum tube, first introduced in the mid-1950s and frequently used as a microwave amplifier in very-high-power transmitters.

Raytheon engineer William C. Brown's work to adapt magnetron principles to create a new broadband amplifier is generally recognized as the first CFA, which he called an Amplitron. Other names that are sometimes used by CFA manufacturers include Platinotron or Stabilotron.

A CFA has lower gain and bandwidth than other microwave amplifier tubes (such as klystrons or traveling-wave tubes); but it is more efficient and capable of much higher output power.

Peak output powers of many megawatts and average power levels of tens of kilowatts can be achieved, with efficiency ratings over 70 percent. Their current use is in satellite ground stations and deep space communications networks.

== Operation ==
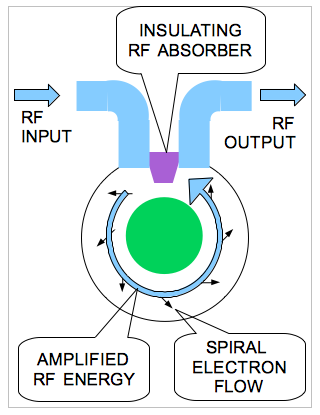
Crossed-field amplifier internal operation

A CFA's electric and magnetic fields are perpendicular to each other ("crossed fields"). This is the same type of field interaction used in a magnetron; as a result, the two devices share many characteristics (such as high peak power and efficiency), and they have similar physical appearances. However, a magnetron is an oscillator, and a CFA is an amplifier (although a CFA can be driven to oscillate by application of improper low voltages as can any amplifier); a CFA's RF circuit (or slow-wave structure) is similar to that in a coupled-cavity TWT.

The CFA has the useful property that when power is shut off, the input simply passes to the output with little loss. This avoids the need for RF bypass switching in the event of failure.

Two CFAs can be connected sequentially with only one powered; if it fails, power can be removed from the primary tube and applied to the secondary as a backup. This approach with built-in redundancy was used on the S-band downlink transmitter on the Apollo Lunar Module, where high efficiency and reliability were needed.

A large negative voltage is placed on the green electrode in the center, and a large magnetic field is directed perpendicular to the page. This forms a thin spinning disk of electrons with a flow pattern like spinning water as it drains from a sink or toilet. A slow-wave structure is located above and below the spinning disk of electrons. Electrons flow much slower than the speed of light, and the slow wave structure reduces the velocity of the input RF enough to match the electron velocity.

The RF input is introduced into the slow wave structure. The alternating microwave field causes the electrons to speed up and slow down alternately. These disturbances grow larger as electrons spiral around the device, and electrons slow down as the RF energy grows. This produces amplification.

There is a small amount of RF feedback from output to input. This creates a slight random phase jitter when the device is pulsed.
