= List of vacuum tubes =

This is a list of vacuum tubes or thermionic valves, and low-pressure gas-filled tubes, or discharge tubes. Before the advent of semiconductor devices, thousands of tube types were used in consumer electronics. Many industrial, military or otherwise professional tubes were also produced. Only a few types are still used today, mainly in high-power, high-frequency applications and also in boutique guitar amplifiers.

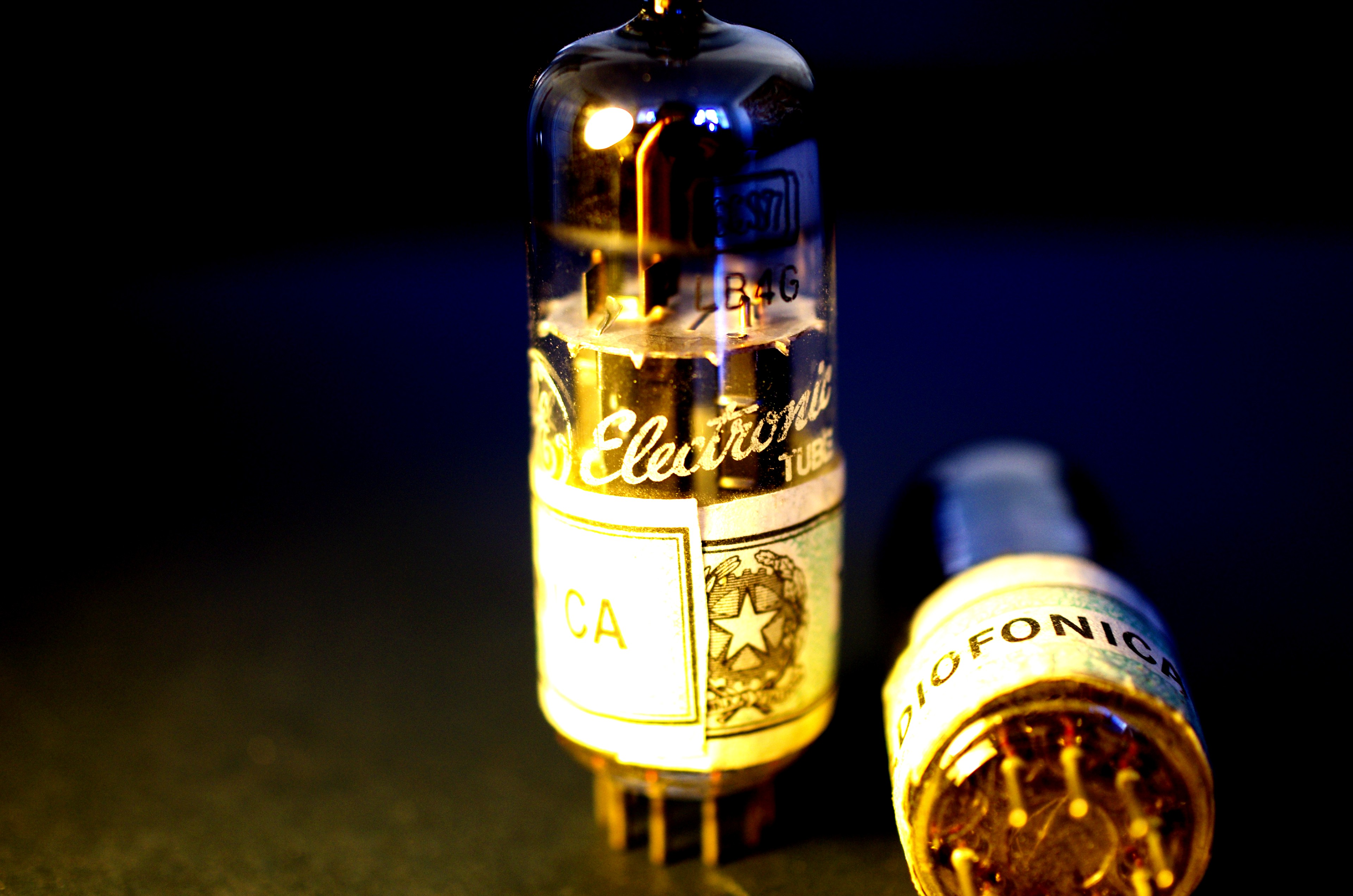
Vintage General Electric 6CS7 vacuum tube marked 'Tassa Radiofonica'

== Heater or filament ratings ==
Receiving tubes have heaters or filaments intended for direct battery operation, parallel operation off a dedicated winding on a supply transformer, or series string operation on transformer-less sets. High-power RF power tubes are directly heated. The heater voltage must be much smaller than the signal voltage on the grid and is therefore in the 5-25 V range, drawing up to hundreds of amperes from a suitable heater transformer. In some valve part number series, the voltage class of the heater is given in the part number, and a similar valve might be available with several different heater voltage ratings.

== Tube bases and envelopes ==
=== Abbreviations used in this list ===
- ST – Shouldered tube
- GT – Glass tube
- MT – Miniature tube, such as Noval B9A or Miniature 7-pin B7G
- FL – Subminiature all-glass elliptical body and flat bases with long, inline "flying leads" (wire-ends) that are soldered into the circuit
- SL – Subminiature all-glass elliptical body and flat bases with short inline leads that can be soldered or can be mated with a special socket. (Flying leads can be cut short to fit into inline sockets.)
- R8 – Subminiature all-glass round body and base with 8 flying leads or stiff pins arranged in a circle

== Numbering systems ==
=== North American systems ===
==== RETMA receiving tubes system ====
RETMA is the acronym for the Radio Electronic Television Manufacturers Association formed in 1953 - however the standard itself had already been in use since 1933, when RCA/Cunningham introduced the 1A6, 2A3, 2A5, etc.

- The first character group is a number representing the heater voltage rounded to the nearest whole number; 0 indicates a cold-cathode tube.
- One or two letters assigned to the devices in order of development.
- A single numeral that represents the number of active elements in the tube.
- Suffix letters distinguish revisions or variants:

- A, B, C – Improved backward compatible versions
- E – Export version
- G – Glass bulb, ST-12 to ST-16 size
- GT – Glass bulb, T-9 size
- GT/G – Glass bulb, T-9 size interchangeable with G and GT types
- L – Loctal
- LM – Loctal-metal
- LT – Locking base
- M – Metal envelope
- MG – Metal-glass
- ML – Metal-Loctal
- S – Spray shielded
- W – Ruggedised, or military grade
- WA, WB – Improved, backward compatible military/industrial variants
- X – Low loss ceramic base for RF use
- Y – Low loss mica-filled phenolic resin ("Micanol") base for RF use

- Lastly, manufacturers may decide to combine two type numbers into a single name, which their one device can replace, such as: 6DX8/ECL84 (6DX8 and ECL84 being identical devices under different naming schemes) or 6BC5/6CE5 (sufficiently identical devices within the RETMA naming system) and even 3A3/3B2, or 6AC5-GT/6AC5-G (where the single type number, 6AC5-GT/6AC5-G, supersedes both the 6AC5-G and the 6AC5-GT).

Often designations that differed only in their initial numerals would be identical except for heater characteristics.

For examples see below

==== RMA professional tubes system ====
The system was used in 1942–44 and assigned numbers with the base form "1A21", and is therefore also referred to as the "1A21 system". The first numeric character indicated the filament/heater power rating, the second alphabetic character was a code for the function, and the last 2 digits were sequentially assigned, beginning with 21

For examples see below.

==== EIA professional tubes system ====
A four-digit system was maintained by JETEC since 1944, then by EIA since 1957 for special industrial, military and professional vacuum and gas-filled tubes, and all sorts of other devices requiring to be sealed off against the external atmosphere.

Some manufacturers preceded the EIA number with a manufacturer's code:

- CK, RK – Raytheon Company
- ECG – Philips/Sylvania
- F – Federal Telephone and Radio (ITT division)
- GL – General Electric Corp. (not British General Electric Company)
- ML – Machlett Laboratories, Inc.
- NL – National Electronics, Inc. (Geneva, Illinois, USA)
- NU – National Union Electric Corp. (Orange, New Jersey, USA)
- PL – Philips N.V.
- SV – Svetlana:

- formerly only PJSC "Svetlana/ПАО Светлана", St. Petersburg, Russia
- now also a brand of New Sensor Corp., Long Island City, New York, USA, manufacturing in Saratov, Russia

- WL – Westinghouse Electric Corp.

For examples see below.

==== Eimac transmitting tubes system ====
Eitel-McCullough and other manufacturers of high power RF tubes use the following code since 1945:

- An initial digit denoting the number of electrodes:

- 2 – Diode
- 3 – Triode
- 4 – Tetrode
- 5 – Pentode

- Up to 2 letters denoting the construction type and the cooling method:

- R or a dash ("-") – Glass envelope, radiation cooling
- C – Ceramic envelope
- K – (Reflex-)Klystron
- P – Primarily for pulse applications
- L – External anode, liquid convection cooling
- N – External anode, natural convection air cooling
- S – External anode, conduction cooling
- V – Vapor cooled (anode is immersed in boiling water, and the steam is collected, condensed and recycled)
- W – Water cooled (water is pumped through an outer metal jacket thermically connected to the anode)
- X – Forced-air cooled (air is blown through cooling fins thermally connected to the anode)

- A number to indicate the maximum anode dissipation in watts. This can be exceeded for a short time, as long as the average is not exceeded over the anode's thermal time constant (typically 0.1 sec). In Class-C applications, the amplifier output power delivered to the load may be higher than the device dissipation
- One or more manufacturer-proprietary letters denoting the construction variant
- An optional digit denoting the gain group:

- 1 – ≤10
- 2 – 11...20
- 3 – 21...30
- 4 – 31...50
- 5 – 51...100
- 6 – 101...200
- 7 – 201...500
- 8 – 501...1000

- Optionally a slash "/" followed by the RMA or EIA equivalent.

Examples:

- 3CW5000A3 – 5 kW Ceramic triode, water cooled, variant 'A', gain group 3
- 3CX100A5 – 100 W Ceramic UHF triode, forced-air cooled, variant 'A', gain group 5; often used by radio amateurs for 23cm-band microwave amplifiers.
- 3CX1500A7 (8877) – 1.5 kW Ceramic triode, forced air cooled, variant 'A', gain group 7
- 3CX2500A3 – 2.5 kW Ceramic triode, forced air cooled, variant 'A', gain group 3
- 4-65A (8165) – 65 W Glass beam tetrode
- 4-125A (4D21, 6155) – 125 W Glass beam tetrode
- 4-250A (5D22, 6156) – 110 MHz, 250 W Glass beam tetrode
- 4-400A – 400 W Glass beam tetrode
- 4-1000A (8166) – 1 kW Glass beam tetrode popular in broadcast and amateur transmitters.
- 4CX250B – 250 W Ceramic tetrode, forced-air cooled, version 'B', favored by radio amateurs as a final amplifier.
- 4CX250BC – 250 W Ceramic tetrode, forced-air cooled, version 'BC'
- 4CX35000 – Ceramic tetrode used in numerous 50-kW broadcast transmitters, forced-air cooled, often in a Doherty configuration as in the Continental Electronics 317C series.
- 5-125B/4E27A – 75 MHz, 125 W Glass power pentode
- 5-500A – 500 W Glass radial-beam pentode
- 5CX1500A – 110 MHz, 1.5 kW Ceramic radial-beam pentode, forced air cooled
- 5CX3000A – 150 MHz, 4.0 kW Ceramic radial-beam pentode, forced air cooled
- 5K70SH – 30 kW S-band Klystron

=== West European systems ===
==== Mullard–Philips system ====
This system is very descriptive of what type of device (triode, diode, pentode etc.) it is applied to, as well as the heater/filament type and the base type (octal, noval, etc.). Adhering manufacturers include AEG (de), Amperex (us), CdL (1921, French Mazda brand), CIFTE (fr, Mazda-Belvu brand), EdiSwan (uk, British Mazda brand), Radiotechnique (fr, Coprim, Miniwatt-Dario and RTC brands), Lorenz (de), MBLE^{(fr, nl)} (be, Adzam brand), Mullard (uk), Philips (nl, Miniwatt brand), RCA (us), RFT^{(de, sv)} (de), Siemens (de), Telefunken (de), Tesla (cz), Toshiba (ja), Tungsram (hu), Unitra (pl, Dolam, Polam and Telam brands) and Valvo^{(de, it)} (de).

===== Standard tubes =====
This part dates back to the joint valve code key (German: Röhren-Gemeinschaftsschlüssel) negotiated between Philips and Telefunken in 1933–34. Like the North American system the first symbol describes the heater voltage, in this case, a Roman letter rather than a number. Further Roman letters, up to three, describe the device followed by one to four numerals assigned in a semi-chronological order of type development within number ranges assigned to different base types.

If two devices share the same type designation other than the first letter (e.g. ECL82, PCL82, UCL82) they will usually be identical except for heater specifications; however there are exceptions, particularly with output types (for example, both the PL84 and UL84 differ significantly from the EL84 in certain major characteristics, although they have the same pinout and similar power rating). However, device numbers do not reveal any similarity between different type families; e.g. the triode section of an ECL82 is not related to either triode of an ECC82, whereas the triode section of an ECL86 does happen to be similar to those of an ECC83.

Pro Electron maintained a subset of the M-P system after their establishment in 1966, with only the first letters E, P for the heater, only the second letters A, B, C, D, E, F, H, K, L, M, Y, Z for the type, and issuing only three-digit numbers starting with 1, 2, 3, 5, 8, 9 for the base.

Notes: Tungsram preceded the M-P designation with the letter T, as in TAD1 for AD1; VATEA Rádiótechnikai és Villamossági Rt.-t. (VATEA Radio Technology and Electric Co. Ltd., Budapest, Hungary) preceded the M-P designation with the letter V, as in VEL5 for EL5.

- First letter: heater/filament type

Heater ratings for series-string, AC/DC tubes are given in milliamperes; heater ratings for parallel-string tubes are given in volts

- A – 4 V heater for 2-cell lead-acid batteries and for AC mains transformers
- B – 180 mA DC series heater
- C – 200 mA AC/DC series heater
- D – 1.4 V DC filament for Leclanché cells, later low-voltage/low power filament/heater:

- 0.625 V DC directly heated for NiCd battery, series-heated two-tube designs such as hearing aids. If either filament breaks, further draining of all batteries stops
- Wide range 0.9 V to 1.55 V DC directly heated for dry cells
- 1.25 V DC directly heated for NiCd batteries
- 1.25 V or 1.4 V AC from a separate heater winding on CRT horizontal-output transformers, in half-indirectly heated EHT rectifiers

- E – 6.3 V parallel heater; for 3-cell lead-acid vehicle crank batteries (mobile equipment) and for AC mains or horizontal-output transformers
- F – 12.6 V DC parallel heater for 6-cell lead-acid vehicle crank batteries
- G – Various heaters between 2.5 and 5.0 V AC (except 4 V) from a separate heater winding on a mains or horizontal-output transformer for the anode voltage rectifier
- H – 150 mA AC/DC series heater

- Until at least 1938: 4 V battery (as opposed to A for "4 V AC"; no known examples assigned)

- I – 20 V heater
- K – 2.0 V filament for 1-cell lead-acid batteries, later for AC transformers
- L – 450 mA AC/DC series heater; was shifted here from Y
- M – 1.9 V, directly heated
- N – 12.6 V, indirectly heated
- O – Cold cathode

- by 1955 this also included semiconductors as these had no heater
- Philips sold a family of 150mA series heater tubes under this letter in South America

- P – 300 mA AC/DC series heater
- Q – 2.4 V, indirectly heated
- R – Not assigned to avoid any confusion with the older Telefunken "R" system
- S – 1.9 V, indirectly heated
- T – Custom heater
- U – 100 mA AC/DC series heater
- V – 50 mA AC/DC series heater
- X – 600 mA AC/DC series heater
- Y – 450 mA AC/DC series heater, shifted to L to avoid conflicts with the professional tubes system
- Z – Cold cathode tube; was shifted here from O after the advent of semiconductors

- Second and subsequent letters: system type

- <none> or R – Resistive element (ballast tube, barretter, photoresistor)
- A – Small signal diode
- B – Dual small signal diode
- C – Small signal triode
- D – Power output triode
- E – Small signal tetrode
- F – Small signal pentode
- H – Mixer hexode, special purpose heptode
- K – Mixer heptode or octode
- L – Power output, beam tetrode or pentode
- M – Optical tuning/level indicator
- N – Noble-gas Thyratron
- P – Secondary emission tube – mostly used as third letter
- Q – Nonode
- S – Special tube (German: Sonderröhre)
- T – Beam deflection tube, or misc.
- W – Gas-filled half-wave rectifier
- X – Gas-filled full-wave rectifier
- Y – Vacuum half-wave rectifier (power diode)
- Z – Vacuum full-wave rectifier (dual power diode with common cathode)

- Following digits: model number and base type

For signal pentodes, an odd model number most often identified a variable-mu (remote-cutoff) tube, whereas an even number identified a 'high slope' (sharp-cutoff) tube
For power pentodes and triode-pentode combinations, even numbers usually indicate linear (audio power amplifier) devices while odd numbers were more suited to video signals or situations where more distortion could be tolerated.

- 1–9 – Pinch-type construction tubes, mostly P8A side-contact 8-pin bases (P base) or V5A side-contact 5-pin (V base) and various other European pre-octal designs
- 10–19 – Y8A 8-pin steel tube base, aka "German metal octal"
- 20–29 – Loctal B8G; some octal; some 8-way side contact (exceptions are DAC21, DBC21, DCH21, DF21, DF22, DL21, DLL21, DM21 which have octal bases)
- 30–39 – International Octal (IEC 67-I-5a), also known as IO or K8A
- 40–49 – Rimlok (Rimlock) B8A All-glass miniature tubes

- 41w – Battery-heated cup tube (German: Pressnapfröhre)

- 50–59 – "Special construction types fitted with bases applicable to design features used"; mostly locking bases: "9-pin Loctal" (B9G) or 8-pin Loctal (B8G); but also used for Octal and others (3-pin glass; Disk-seal incl. Lighthouse tubes; German 10-pin with spigot; min. 4-pin; B26A; Magnoval B9D)
- 60–69 – Pencil tubes – sub-miniature all-glass tubes, wire-ended (inline fly-leads in place of pins)

—Before the 1950s:
- 60–64 – All-glass tubes fitted with 9-pin Loctal (B9G) bases

- 70–79 – Pencil tubes with circular pins or fly-leads

—Before the 1950s:
- 70–79 – 8-pin Loctal (Lorenz)

- 80–89 – Noval B9A (9-pin; IEC 67-I-12a)
- 90–99 – "Button" B7G (miniature 7-pin; IEC 67-I-10a)
- 100–109 – B7G; Wehrmacht base; German PTT base
- 110–119 – Y8A 8-pin steel tube base; Rimlock B8A
- 130–139 – Octal
- 150–159 – German 10-pin with spigot; 10-pin glass with one big pin; Octal
- 160–169 – Inline wire-ended Pencil tubes; Y8A 8-pin steel tube base
- 170–179 – RFT 8-pin; RFT 11-pin all-glass gnome tube with one offset pin
- 180–189 – Noval B9A
- 190–199 – Miniature 7-pin B7G
- 200–209 – Decal B10B
- 230–239 – Octal
- 270–279 – RFT 11-pin all glass with one offset pin
- 280–289 – Noval B9A
- 300–399 – Octal
- 400–499 – Rimlock B8A
- 500–529 – Magnoval B9D
- 600–699 – Inline wire-ended Pencil tubes
- 700–799 – Circular wire-ended Pencil tubes
- 800–899 – Noval B9A
- 900–999 – Miniature 7-pin B7G

—Special quality:

- 1000– Round wire-ended; special Nuvistor base
- 2000– Decal B10B
- 3000– Octal
- 5000– Magnoval B9D
- 8000– Noval B9A

For examples see below

===== Special quality tubes =====
Vacuum tubes which had special qualities of some sort, very often long-life designs, particularly for computer and telecommunications use, had the numeric part of the designation placed immediately after the first letter. They were usually special-quality versions of standard types. Thus the E82CC was a long-life version of the ECC82 intended for computer and general signal use, and the E88CC a high quality version of the ECC88/6DJ8. While the E80F pentode was a high quality development of the EF80, they were not pin-compatible and could not be interchanged without rewiring the socket (the E80F is commonly sought after as a high quality replacement for the similar EF86 type in guitar amplifiers). The letters "CC" indicated the two triodes and the "F", the single pentode inside these types.

A few special-quality tubes did not have a standard equivalent, e.g. the E55L, a broadband power pentode used as the output stage of oscilloscope amplifiers and the E90CC, a dual triode with a common cathode connection and seven pin base for use in cathode-coupled Flip-flops in early computers. The E91H is a special heptode with a passivated third grid designed to reduce secondary emission; this device was used as a "gate", allowing or blocking pulses applied to the first, (control) grid by changing the voltage on the third grid, in early computer circuits (similar in function to the U.S. 6AS6).

Many of these types had gold-plated base pins and special heater configurations inside the nickel cathode tube designed to reduce hum pickup from the A.C. heater supply, and also had improved oxide insulation between the heater and cathode so the cathode could be elevated to a greater voltage above the heater supply. (Note that elevating the cathode voltage above the average heater voltage, which in well-designed equipment was supplied from a transformer with an earthed center-tapped secondary, was less detrimental to the oxide insulation between heater and cathode than lowering the cathode voltage below the heater voltage, helping to prevent pyrometallurgical electrolytic chemical reactions where the oxide touched the nickel cathode that could form conductive aluminium tungstate and which could ultimately develop into a heater-cathode short circuit.)

Better, often dual, getters were implemented to maintain a better vacuum, and more-rigid electrode supports introduced to reduce microphonics and improve vibration and shock resistance. The mica spacers used in "SQ" and "PQ" types did not possess sharp protrusions which could flake off and become loose inside the bulb, possibly lodging between the grids and thus changing the characteristics of the device. Some types, particularly the E80F, E88CC and E90CC, had a constricted section of bulb to firmly hold specially shaped flakeless mica spacers.

For examples see below, starting at DC

Later special-quality tubes had not base and function swapped but were assigned a 4-digit number, such as ECC2000 or ED8000, the first digit of which again denoting the base:

- 1 – Miscellaneous
- 2 – 10-pin Decal base (JEDEC E10-61)
- 3 – Octal base (IEC 67-1-5a)
- 5 – Magnoval base (JEDEC E9-23)
- 8 – Noval base (IEC 67-1-12a)
- 9 – Miniature 7-pin base (IEC 67-1-10a)

For examples see below, starting at EC

"Z" Cold-cathode SQ tubes had a different function letter scheme:

- A – Arc discharge tube
- B – Binary counter or switching tube
- C – Common-cathode Counter Dekatron that makes only carry/borrow cathodes separately available for cascading
- E – Electrometer tube
- G – Gating tube
- M – Optical indicator
- S – Separate-cathode Counter/Selector Dekatron that makes all cathodes available on individual pins for displaying, divide-by-n counter/timer/prescalers, etc.
- T – Relay triode, a low-power triode thyratron, one starter electrode, may need illumination for proper operation if not radioactively primed
- U – Low-power tetrode thyratron, may mean:

- Trigger tetrode, one starter electrode and a primer (keep-alive) electrode for ion availability to keep the ignition voltage constant, for analog RC timers, voltage triggers, etc.
- Relay tetrode, two starter electrodes to make counters bidirectional or resettable

- W – Trigger pentode, two starter electrodes and a primer electrode
- X – Shielded Trigger pentode, two starter electrodes, a primer electrode and a conductive coating of the glass envelope inside connected to a separate pin

For examples, see below under Z

===== Professional tubes =====
In use since at least 1961, this system was maintained by Pro Electron after their establishment in 1966.

Both letters together indicate the type:

- X – High vacuum electro-optical devices

- XA – Phototube
- XG – Miscellaneous
- XM – Character generating cathode ray tube
- XP – Photomultiplier
- XQ – Camera tube
- XR – Monoscope
- XS – Cathode ray charge storage tube
- XT – Memory display tube
- XV – Infrared detector
- XW – Infrared imaging device
- XX – Image intensifier or image converter

- Y – Vacuum tubes

- YA – Diode
- YD – Transmitting or industrial, single or dual triode
- YG – Electrometer tube, vacuum gauge
- YH – Traveling-wave tube
- YJ – Magnetron
- YK – Klystron
- YL – Transmitting or industrial, single or dual tetrode or pentode
- YN – Backward-wave oscillator
- YP – Electron multiplier
- YR – Crossed-field amplifier
- YT – Pulse modulator tube
- YY – High vacuum rectifier

- Z – Gas-filled tubes not employing photosensitive materials

- ZA – Cold cathode indicator tube
- ZB – Microwave switching tube (TR/ATR cells, etc.)
- ZC – Trigger tube
- ZD – Surge arrester
- ZE – Glow modulator tube, a linear light source for rotating-drum FAX receivers, film soundtrack recording, etc.
- ZF – Flash tube
- ZL – Gas laser
- ZM – Cold cathode character display tube or counter display tube
- ZP – Radiation counter tube (Geiger-Müller counter tube or proportional counter tube)
- ZQ – Mixed analogue and digital display
- ZR – Plasma display panel
- ZS – Bar graph
- ZT – Thyratron
- ZX – Ignitron
- ZY – Mercury-vapor rectifier
- ZZ – Voltage stabilizer or corona discharge tube

Then follows a 4-digit sequentially assigned number.

Optional suffixes for camera tubes:

Version letter:

- B – Blue
- G – Green
- L – Luminance
- R – Red
- T – Reticule
- X – Medical X-ray

Letter for variants derived by selection:

- D – High resolution
- M – Blemish standard

For examples see below

===== Transmitting tubes =====
The first letter (or letter pair, in the case of a dual-system device) indicates the general type:

- B – Backward-wave amplifier
- D – Rectifier, including grid-controlled types
- J – Magnetron
- K – Klystron
- L – Traveling-wave tube
- M – Triode (AF amplifier or modulator)
- P – Pentode
- Q – Tetrode
- R – Rectifier, including grid-controlled types
- T – Triode (RF, oscillator)
- X – Large thyratron (including all hydrogen thyratrons and high-current types)

The following letter indicates the filament or cathode type, or the fill gas or other construction detail. The coding for vacuum devices differs between Philips (and other Continental European manufacturers) on the one hand and its Mullard subsidiary on the other.

Philips vacuum devices:
- A

- Microwave tubes: Output power <1W
- Other tubes: Directly heated tungsten filament

- B

- Microwave tubes: Output power ≥1W
- Other tubes: Directly heated thoriated tungsten filament

- C – Directly heated oxide-coated filament
- E – Indirectly heated oxide-coated cathode

Mullard vacuum devices:
- D – Disk-seal construction
- N – External magnet required (magnetrons)
- P – Packaged construction (magnetrons)
- S – Reflex klystron
- T – Multiple resonator (klystrons)
- V – Indirectly heated oxide-coated cathode
- X – Directly heated tungsten filament
- Y – Directly heated thoriated tungsten filament
- Z – Directly heated oxide-coated filament (except mercury-vapor rectifiers)

Gas-filled devices:
- G – Mercury-vapor filling, directly heated oxide-coated filament
- H – Hydrogen filling
- R – Rare-gas filling
- X – Xenon filling

The next letter indicates the cooling method or other significant characteristic:

- H – Helix or other integral cooler
- L – Forced-air cooling
- Q – Shield-grid (tetrode) thyratron (thyratrons only)
- S – Silica envelope, to allow for a glowing anode
- T – Tunable microwave device
- W – Water cooling

The following group of digits indicate:

- Microwave tubes: Frequency in GHz
- Rectifying tubes: DC output voltage in kV
- Thyratrons: Peak inverse voltage in kV
- Transmitting tubes: Maximum anode voltage in kV

The following group of digits indicate the power:

- Backward-wave amplifier or Traveling-wave tube: Output power

- 2nd letter: A – in mW
- 2nd letter: B – in W

- Klystrons: Output power in W
- Reflex Klystrons: Output power in mW
- Magnetrons: Pulse output power in kW
- Continuously transmitting tubes: Maximum anode dissipation in W or kW in Class-C amplifier telegraphy
- Pulsed transmitting tubes: Maximum peak anode current in A (number preceded by "P")
- Rectifiers: Maximum average anode current in mA
- Thyratrons: Maximum average anode current:

- Less than 3 digits: in mA
- 3 or more digits:

- 1st digit: =0 – in mA
- 1st digit: >0 – in A

An optional following letter indicates the base or connection method:

- B – Cables
- E – Medium 7-pin U7A base
- ED – Edison screw E27 lamp base
- EG – Goliath E40 lamp base
- F – 12.6V Heater
- G – Medium 4-pin UX4 base
- GB – Jumbo 4-pin base
- GS – Superjumbo 4-pin base
- N – Medium 5-pin UY5 base
- P – Side-contact 8-pin base

For examples see below

===== Phototubes and photomultipliers =====
The first digit indicates the tube base:

- 2 – Loctal 8-pin base
- 3 – Octal base
- 5, 6 – Special base or flying leads
- 8 – Noval base
- 9 – Miniature 7-pin base

The second digit is a sequentially assigned number.

The following letter indicates the photocathode type:

- A – Caesium-activated antimony cathode. Used for reflective-mode photocathodes. Response range from ultraviolet to visible. Widely used.
- C – Caesium-on-oxidated-silver cathode, also called S1. Transmission-mode, sensitive from 300...1200 nm. High dark current; used mainly in near-infrared, with the photocathode cooled.
- T – Trialkali sodium-potassium-antimony-caesium cathode, wide spectral response from ultraviolet to near-infrared; special cathode processing can extend range to 930 nm. Used in broadband spectrophotometers.
- U – Caesium-antimony cathode with a quartz window

The following letter indicates the filling:

- G – Gas-filled
- V – High-vacuum

A following letter P indicates a photomultiplier.

Examples:

- 50AVP – 11-stage photomultiplier for scintillation counters, duodecal base
- 51UVP – 11-stage photomultiplier, duodecal base
- 52AVP/XP1180 – 10-stage photomultiplier, 13-pin base
- 53AVP, 153AVP – 10-stage photomultiplier, diheptal 14-pin base
- 53UVP – 11-stage photomultiplier, diheptal 14-pin base
- 54AVP – 11-stage photomultiplier, diheptal 14-pin base
- 55AVP – 15-stage photomultiplier, bidecal 20-pin base
- 56AVP – 14-stage photomultiplier, bidecal 20-pin base
- 56UVP – 14-stage photomultiplier, duodecal base
- 57AVP – 11-stage photomultiplier, bidecal 20-pin base
- 58AVP – 14-stage photomultiplier, bidecal 20-pin base
- 150AVP – 10-stage photomultiplier, bidecal 20-pin base
- 150CVP – 10-stage photomultiplier, bidecal 20-pin base
- 57CV – Photometric cell
- 58CG – Gas-filled phototube, Red/IR sensitive, all-glass wire-ended
- 58CV – Vacuum phototube, Red/IR sensitive, all-glass wire-ended
- 90AG – Gas-filled phototube, daylight/blue sensitive, miniature 7-pin base
- 90AV – Vacuum phototube, blue sensitive, miniature 7-pin base
- 90CG – Gas-filled phototube, Red/IR sensitive, miniature 7-pin base
- 90CV – Vacuum phototube, Red/IR sensitive, miniature 7-pin base
- 92AG – Gas-filled phototube, blue sensitive, miniature 7-pin base
- 92AV – Vacuum phototube, blue sensitive, miniature 7-pin base
- 61SV/7634 – PbS infrared (300...3500 nm) photoresistor, 2-pin all-glass wire-ended

===== Voltage stabilizers =====
The first number indicates the burning voltage

The following letter indicates the current range:

- A – max. 10mA
- B – max. 22mA
- C – max. 60mA
- D – max. 100mA
- E – max. 200mA

The following digit is a sequentially assigned number.

An optional, following letter indicates the base:

- E – Edison screw lamp base
- K – Octal base
- P – Side-contact 8-pin base

Examples:

- 75B1 – Voltage reference tube, miniature 7-pin base
- 75C1 – Voltage reference tube, miniature 7-pin base
- 83A1 – Voltage reference tube, miniature 7-pin base
- 85A1/0E3 – Voltage reference tube, B8G Loctal base
- 85A2/0G3 – Voltage reference tube, miniature 7-pin base
- 90C1 – Voltage reference tube, miniature 7-pin base
- 95A1 – Voltage reference tube, miniature 7-pin base
- 100E1 – Voltage reference tube, A4A European 4-pin Base
- 108C1/0B2 – Voltage reference tube, miniature 7-pin base
- 150A1 – Voltage reference tube, P8A side-contact 8 base
- 150B2 – Voltage reference tube, miniature 7-pin base
- 150B3 – Voltage reference tube, miniature 7-pin base
- 150C1 – Voltage reference tube, P8A side-contact 8 base
- 150C2/0A2 – Voltage reference tube, miniature 7-pin base
- 150C4 – Voltage reference tube, miniature 7-pin base

==== Compagnie des Lampes (1888, "Métal") system ====
The first (1888) incarnation of La Compagnie des Lampes produced the TM tube since 1915 and defined one of the first French systems; not to be confused with Compagnie des Lampes (1921, "French Mazda", see below).

First letter: Heater or filament voltage

- A – 1 V
- B – 2 V
- D – 4 V
- E – 5 V
- F – 6 V
- G – 7 V

Second letter: Heater or filament current

- W – ≥200 mA
- X – 150 mA
- Y – 100...140 mA
- Z – <100 mA

Next number: Gain

Next number: Internal resistance in kΩ

Examples:

- BW604 – Métal secteur indirectly AC-heated AF power triode
- BW1010 – Métal secteur indirectly AC-heated AF triode

==== EdiSwan ("British Mazda") systems ====
EdiSwan (British Mazda) is not to be confused with other licensees of General Electric's Mazda brand:
- GE's own subsidiary British Thomson-Houston
- C^{ie} des Lampes (1921, French Mazda, see below)
- C^{ie} Industrielle Française des Tubes Electroniques – CIFTE (Mazda-Belvu – originating from Societé Radio Belvu; see below)
- Manufacture Belge des Lampes Électriques,^{(fr, nl)} producing:

- Light bulbs since 1911 under the Belgian Mazda brand
- Electronic tubes since 1924 under the Adzam ("Mazda" spelled backwards) brand

Note: EdiSwan also used the Mullard–Philips scheme.

===== Signal tubes =====
First number: Heater or filament rating

- 0 – Misc. higher voltages
- 1 – 1.4 V
- 6 – 6.3 V
- 10 – 100 mA
- 20 – 200 mA
- 30 – 300 mA

Following letter or letter sequence: Type

- C – Frequency changer with special oscillator section
- D – Signal diode(s)
- F – Tetrode or pentode
- FD – Tetrode or pentode and diode(s)
- FL – Tetrode or pentode, and triode
- K – Small gas triode or tetrode thyratron
- L – Single or dual triode, including oscillator triode
- LD – Triode and diode(s)
- M – Optical tuning/level indicator
- P – Power tetrode or pentode
- PL – Power tetrode or pentode, and signal triode

Final number: Sequentially assigned number

===== Power tubes =====
Letter(s): Type

- U – High-vacuum half-wave rectifier
- UU – High-vacuum full-wave rectifier

Number: Sequentially assigned number

Examples:

Note: "AC/"-series receiver tubes are listed under other letter tubes - AC/

- 6C10 (6CU7/ECH42) – Triode/hexode frequency converter, Rimlock base
- 6F22 (6267/EF86) – Low-noise A.F. pentode, noval base
- 6F33 – Shielded pentode, Miniature 7-pin base
- 6L12 (6AQ8/ECC85) – Dual triode, noval base
- 6L19 – Dual triode, Rimlock base
- 6M2 (6CD7/EM34) – Dual-sensitivity tuning indicator, octal base
- 6P15 (6BQ5/EL84) – Power pentode, noval base
- 10PL12 (50BM8/UCL82) – Triode/power pentode, noval base
- U381 (38A3/UY85) – Half-wave rectifier, noval base
- UU9 (6BT4/EZ40) – Full-wave rectifier, rimlock base

==== EEV system ====
This system consists of one or more letters followed by a sequentially assigned number

- A – High vacuum rectifier
- AFX – Rare-gas filled triode thyratron
- AH – Mercury-vapor rectifier
- AX – Xenon filled rectifier
- B – Radiation-cooled triode
- BD – Mercury vapor rectifier
- BK – Ignitron
- BM – Magnetron
- BR – Forced air cooled triode
- BS – TR (Transmit/receive) cell, TB cell, Solid-state microwave device
- BT – Mercury vapor or xenon filled thyratron
- BW – Water cooled triode
- BY – Vapor cooled triode
- C – Radiation-cooled tetrode
- CR – Forced air cooled tetrode
- CW – Water cooled tetrode
- CX – Hydrogen tetrode thyratron
- E – Storage tube
- FX – Hydrogen triode thyratron
- GX – Spark gap
- K – Klystron
- M – Magnetron
- NFT – Nernst filament, a source of mid-infrared radiation
- P – Video camera tube
- QS – Voltage-regulator tube
- QT – Cold-cathode trigger tube
- T – CRT
- U – Vacuum capacitor
- XL – Glow modulator tube, flash tube, gas laser

Examples:

- B142 – 400 W RF power triode up to 50 MHz similar to 833A
- B1109 = 3C24 – 25 W VHF power triode up to 60 MHz
- B1135 = 5867 = CV1350 – VHF power triode up to 100 MHz
- B1152 – 500W RF power triode up to 50 MHz
- QT1257 – Touch button tube, an illuminated capacitance touch switch; a cold-cathode DC relay tube, external (capacitive) starter activated by touching; then the cathode glow is visible. 6-pin octal base
- XL601, XL602, XL603, XL627, XL628, XL631 and XL632 – Cold-cathode, linear light source (glow modulator tube), gas diode with a blue-violet glow, modulation up to 1 MHz, 2-pin Octal base, for rotating-drum FAX receivers, etc.

==== ETL computing tubes system ====
The British Ericsson Telephones Limited (ETL), of Beeston, Nottingham (not to be confused with the Swedish TelefonAB Ericsson), original holder of the now-generic trademark Dekatron, used the following system:

- An initial letter denoting the filling:

- G – Noble gas-filled
- V – Vacuum

- One letter denoting the type:

- C – Common-cathode Counter Dekatron that makes only carry/borrow cathodes separately available for cascading
- D – Diode, voltage reference, etc.
- R – Register (Readout) – Digital indicator
- S – Trochotron or Separate-cathode Counter/Selector Dekatron that makes all cathodes available on individual pins for displaying, divide-by-n counter/timer/prescalers, etc.
- TE – Trigger tetrode, one starter electrode and a keep-alive (primer) electrode for ion availability
- TR – Trigger triode, one starter electrode only

- A digit group:

- Dekatrons: Stage count
- Digital indicators: Display cathode count
- Diodes, voltage references: Nominal voltage
- Trigger tubes: Ignition voltage

- An optional digit group after a slash: Pin count
- One letter denoting the type:

- A – Plastic base
- B – Plastic base
- C – Plastic base
- D – Plastic base
- E – Plastic base
- G – 26-pin B26A base
- H – 27-pin B27A base
- M – B7G base
- P – B7G base
- Q – B7G base
- W – Wire-ends
- X – Wire-ends
- Y – Wire-ends

Examples:

- GC10/2P – Neon-filled, 1 kHz Miniature decade Counter Dekatron, a gas-filled, bidirecional decade counter tube
- GC10A – Helium-filled, decade Counter Dekatron
- GC10B – Neon-filled, 4 kHz Long life, decade Counter Dekatron

- GC10/4B – 4 kHz Decade Computing Counter Dekatron with carry/borrow cathodes "0" and "9" and intermediate cathodes "3" and "5" wired to separate pins

- GC10D – 20 kHz Decade Counter Dekatron, for single-pulse operation
- GC12/4B – 4 kHz Duodecimal Counter Dekatron with carry/borrow cathodes 11 and 12 and intermediate cathodes 6 and 8 wired to separate pins
- GCA10G – 10 kHz max. Decade Counter Dekatron with routing guides and aux anodes to directly drive Nixie tubes, B27A base without the inner pin ring
- GD2V – 2 kV, 16 J discharge tube, all-glass studded
- GD75P – 75 V Voltage reference, miniature 7-pin base
- GD90M – 90 V Voltage reference, miniature 7-pin base
- GD340X – 345 V/3...200 μA Corona voltage reference, all-glass wire-ended
- GD350X, GD350Y – 350 V/3...200 μA Corona voltage reference, all-glass wire-ended
- GD550W – 550 V, 1.5 J Discharge tube, e.g. for power relaxation oscillators, all-glass wire-ended
- GDT120M – 9 mA Gas-filled cold-cathode DC triode, one starter and a separate glow diode acting as an optical primer, miniature 7-pin base
- GR2G – + - Neon-filled digital indicator tube, 18 x 18 mm characters, side-viewing
- GR2H – + - Neon-filled digital indicator tube, 20 x 20 mm characters, top-viewing
- GR4G – 1/4 1/2 3/4 1 Neon-filled digital indicator tube, 18 x 30 mm characters, side-viewing
- GR7M – + - V A Ω % ~ Neon-filled digital indicator tube, 15.5 mm character height, top-viewing
- GR10A – Gas-filled digital indicator tube with a dekatron-type readout
- GR10G – 0 1 2 3 4 5 6 7 8 9 Neon-filled digital indicator tube, 16.86 x 30 mm characters, side-viewing
- GR10H – 0 1 2 3 4 5 6 7 8 9 Neon-filled digital indicator tube, 12 x 19 mm characters, top-viewing
- GR10J – 0 1 2 3 4 5 6 7 8 9 Neon-filled digital indicator tube, 16.86 x 30 mm characters, side-viewing
- GR10K – 0 1 2 3 4 5 6 7 8 9 Neon-filled digital indicator tube, 12 x 19 mm characters, top-viewing
- GR10M – 0 1 2 3 4 5 6 7 8 9 Neon-filled digital indicator tube, 10 x 15.5 mm characters, top-viewing
- GR10W – 0 1 2 3 4 5 6 7 8 9 Neon-filled digital indicator tube, 8.42 x 15 mm characters, side-viewing, all-glass wire-ended
- GR12G – A B C D E F G H I J K L Neon-filled digital indicator tube, 16 x 30 mm characters, side-viewing
- GR12H – E L M N P R S T U V W X Neon-filled digital indicator tube, 16 x 30 mm characters, side-viewing

Note: More Nixie tubes under standard - ZM and professional - ZM

- GS10C – 4 kHz max. Decade Counter/Selector Dekatron, top-viewing, duodecal base
- GS10D – Hydrogen-filled, 20 kHz max. Decade Counter/Selector Dekatron, duodecal base
- GS10H – 4 kHz max. Decade Counter/Selector Dekatron with routing guides, B17A base
- GS12C – 4 kHz max. Duodecimal Counter/Selector Dekatron, with solder lugs
- GS12D – Neon-filled, 4 kHz max. duodecimal Counter/Selector Dekatron, duodecal base with two additional wire-ends for the guide electrodes
- GSA10G – 10 kHz max. Decade Counter/Selector Dekatron with routing guides and aux anodes to directly drive Nixie tubes, B27A base
- GTE120Y – 5 mA Subminiature DC trigger tetrode, one starter and one primer, all-glass wire-ended
- GTE130T – 8 mA_{peak} DC trigger tetrode, one starter and one primer, close tolerance, low aging, quadrant I operation only, noval base
- GTE175M – 3.5 mA_{avg}, 50 mA_{peak} DC Trigger tetrode, one starter and one primer, miniature 7-pin base, for Dekatron coupling circuits
- GTR120W – 9 mA Subminiature DC trigger triode, 3-pin all-glass wire-ended, for computer applications
- GTR75M – 75 V Voltage reference, Miniature 7-pin
- GTR95M/S – 95 V Voltage reference, Miniature 7-pin
- GTR150 – Subminiature, primed 150 V voltage reference, all-glass wire-ended
- VS10G – Trochotron, an electron-beam decade counter tube
- VS10G-M – VS10G with a magnetic shield
- VS10H – High-current trochotron
- VS10K – Low-voltage trochotron

==== Marconi-Osram system ====
The British GEC–Marconi–Osram designation from the 1920s uses one or two letter(s) followed by two numerals and sometimes by a second letter identifying different versions of a particular type.

The letter(s) generally denote the type or use:

Note: A preceding letter M indicates a 4-volts AC indirectly heated tube

- A – General professional tube
- B – Dual triode
- D – Detector diode
- GT – Gas-filled triode
- GU – Gas-filled rectifier
- H – High-impedance signal triode
- KT – Kinkless Tetrode - beam power tube
- L – Low-impedance signal triode
- N – Power pentode
- P – Power triode up to 3 W

- PT – Power pentode
- PX – 3...25 W Power triode

- QP – Dual pentode
- S – Tetrode
- U – Rectifier
- VS – Remote-cutoff tetrode
- W – Remote-cutoff pentode
- X – Triode/hexode frequency-changer
- Y – Optical tuning/level indicator
- Z – Sharp-cutoff RF pentode

The following numbers are sequentially assigned for each new device.

Examples:

- A1834 = 6AS7G/ECC230 = CV2523 – Dual power triode (series regulator), octal base.
- B309 = 12AT7/ECC81 – High-mu dual triode. Commonly used as R.F. amplifier/mixer in VHF circuits.
- B719 = 6AQ8/ECC85 – Dual RF triode, RF Amp & Mixer in FM receivers, noval base.
- D41 = V914 – Indirectly heated, Dual Detector Diode, British 5-pin base.
- D42 – Indirectly heated, Single Detector Diode, British 4-pin base.
- GU21 = AH221 = RG4-1250 – Half-wave mercury-vapor rectifier, Edison screw lamp base.
- H63 = 6F5 – High-mu triode, octal base.
- H610 – Directly heated, high-mu AF triode, British 4-pin base.
- KT32 (25L6, 25L6G, 25L6GT and 25W6GT)
- KT33 (25A6GT)
- KT41
- KT61 (6M6G) in parallel filament circuits
- KT63 (6F6, 6F6G, 6F6GT)
- KT66 (6L6GC)
- KT67 – Small transmitting valve
- KT71 (50L6GT)
- KT77 – Similar to EL34, 6CA7
- KT81
- KT88 = 6550A = CV5220 (12E13, 7D11) – AF beam power tube, two tubes are capable of providing 100W output, Class-AB_{1}, octal base
- L63 = 6J5 – Low-mu triode, octal base.
- L610 – Directly heated, Low-mu RF triode, British 4-pin base.
- MT7A, MT7B – Large radiation-cooled transmitting triodes used in the 1920s and 1930s.
- MU14 = UU5 = IW4-500 – Indirectly heated full-wave rectifier, British 4-pin base.
- N77 = 6AM5/EL91 – Power pentode, 7-pin miniature base.
- P425 = PM254 – Power triode with a 4 V/200 mA battery heater and a British 4-pin base
- P610 – Directly heated, AF power triode, British 4-pin base.
- P625 – AF power triode.
- PX4 – AF power triode designed in the 1930s. Capable of providing about 4.5 W of audio.
- QP21 – Directly heated, dual AF (push-pull) power pentode, British 7-pin base.
- QP240 – Directly heated, dual AF (push-pull) power pentode, British 9-pin base.
- S610 – Directly heated, Sharp-cutoff RF tetrode, British 4-pin base.
- U52 = 5U4G = 5AS4A/5U4GB – Full-wave rectifier, octal base.
- VS24 – Directly heated, Remote-cutoff RF tetrode, British 4-pin base.
- W727 = 6BA6/EF93 = 5749 – Remote-cutoff RF pentode, 7-pin miniature base.
- X41 – Triode/hexode mixer designed to be a direct plug-in replacement for the MX40 pentagrid converter.
- X61, X61M = 6J8G – British triode/heptode mixer, octal based.
- X63 = 6A8 – Heptode pentagrid converter, octal based.
- X727 = 6BE6/EK90 = 5750 – Pentagrid converter, 7-pin miniature base.
- Y61, Y63 = 6U5G = VI103 – Optical tuning/level indicator, octal base, similar to 6G5.
- Z77 = 6AM6/EF91 – Sharp-cutoff RF pentode, 7-pin miniature base.

==== Mullard designations before 1934 ====
Older Mullard tubes were mostly designated PM, followed by a number containing the filament voltage.

Many later tubes were designated one to three semi-intuitive letters, followed by a number containing the heater voltage. This was phased out after 1934 when Mullard adopted the Mullard–Philips scheme.

Examples:

- 2D4 – Dual Diode with a 4 V/650 mA heater and a British 5-pin base
- AP4 = 4676 – Acorn UHF pentode up to 430 MHz, 4 Volts heater
- AT4 = 4675 – Acorn UHF triode up to 430 MHz, 4 Volts heater
- FC4 – Octode Frequency Converter with a 4 V/650 mA heater and a British 7-pin base; similar to the M-OV/GEC MX40 heptode
- Pen20 – Power Pentode with a 20 V/180 mA heater and a British 5- or 7-pin base
- PM254 = P425 – "Super Power" triode with a 4 V/200 mA battery heater and a British 4-pin base
- TDD4 – Triode, dual Diode with a 4 V/550 mA heater and a British 7-pin base; similar to 11A2, DDT, AC/HLDD, MHD4
- TH21C – Triode/Hexode frequency converter with a 21 V/200 mA series heater and a British 7-pin base
- TP4 = AC/TP – Triode, Pentode with a 4 V/1.25 A heater and a British 9-pin base
- VP2 – Variable-mu Pentode with a 2 V/180 mA heater and a British 7-pin base; similar to VP21, VP215

==== Philips system before 1934 ====
The system consisted of one letter followed by 3 or 4 digits. It was phased out after 1934 when Philips adopted the Mullard–Philips scheme.

1st letter: Heater current

- A – 60...90 mA
- B – 100...190 mA (This designation lived on as the "B" (180 mA) in the Mullard–Philips system)
- C – 200...390 mA (This designation lived on as the "C" (200 mA) in the Mullard–Philips system)
- D – 400...690 mA
- E – 700...1350 mA
- F – 1.25...2 A

1 or 2 digit(s): Heater voltage

Last 2 digits: Type

- 00–40, 99: Triode amplification factor
- 41–98:

- second-last digit: sequentially assigned, starting at 4
- last digit:

- 1 – Tetrode with a space charge grid (the 2nd grid is the control grid)
- 2 – Tetrode with a screen grid (the 1st grid is the control grid)
- 3 – Power pentode
- 4 – Binode, a diode/triode or diode/tetrode
- 5 – Remote-cutoff RF tetrode
- 6 – Signal pentode
- 7 – Remote-cutoff RF pentode
- 8 – Sharp-cutoff hexode frequency changer
- 9 – Remote-cutoff hexode

Examples:

- A106 – Directly heated triode, 1 V, 60 mA filament, amplification factor = 6
- A425 = RE034 = HR406 – RF triode, 4 V, 60 mA filament
- A435 – Directly heated triode, 4 V, 60 mA filament, amplification factor = 35
- A441 – Directly heated tetrode with a space charge grid, 4 V, 60 mA filament
- A442 = RES094 = S406 – Directly heated tetrode with a screen grid, 4 V, 60 mA filament
- B409 = RE134 = L414 – Triode, 4 Volt, 140 mA filament
- B2038 = REN1821 = R2018 = A2118 – Triode, 180 mA heater
- B2043 = RENS1823D = PP2018D = L2318D – Indirectly heated power pentode, 20 V, 180 mA DC series heater
- B2044 = RENS1854 = DS2218 – Indirectly heated diode/tetrode, 20 V, 180 mA DC series heater

- B2044S = REN1826 – Indirectly heated diode/triode, 20 V, 180 mA DC series heater

- B2045 = RENS1819 – Indirectly heated remote-cutoff RF tetrode, 20 V, 180 mA DC series heater
- B2048 = RENS1824 = MH2018 – Hexode mixer, 20 V, 180 mA heater
- B2099 = REN1814 – Indirectly heated triode, 20 V, 180 mA DC series heater, amplification factor = 99
- E443H = RES964 = PP4101 = L496D – Power pentode, 4 V heater
- E446 = RENS1284 = HP4101 – Indirectly heated RF pentode, 4 V, 1.1 A heater
- E447 = RENS1294 = HP4106 – Indirectly heated remote-cutoff RF pentode, 4 V, 1.1 A heater
- E448 = RENS1224 = MH4100 – Indirectly heated sharp-cutoff hexode frequency changer, 4 V, 1.2 A heater
- E449 = RENS1234 = FH4105 – Indirectly heated remote-cutoff hexode, 4 V, 1.2 A heater
- F215 – Indirectly heated triode, 2.5 V, 1.5 A heater, amplification factor = 15

==== STC/Brimar receiving tubes system ====
First number: Type

- 1 – Half-wave rectifier
- 2 – Diode
- 3 – Power triode
- 4 – High-mu triode
- 5 – Sharp-cutoff tetrode
- 6 – Vari-mu tetrode
- 7 – Power or video pentode
- 8 – Sharp-cutoff RF pentode
- 9 – Vari-mu RF pentode
- 10 – Dual diode
- 11 – Triode and dual diode
- 12 – AF Pentode and dual diode
- 13 – Dual high-mu triode
- 14 – Dual Class-B power triode
- 15 – Heptode
- 16 – DC-coupled power triode
- 17 – RF pentode and dual diode
- 18 – Pentode and triode
- 20 – Hexode/heptode and triode

Next letter: Heater rating

- A – 4 V Indirectly heated
- B – 2 V Directly heated
- C – Other directly heated
- D – Other indirectly heated

Number: Sequentially assigned number

Examples:

- 1D6 – Indirectly heated, half-wave rectifier, British 5-pin base
- 4D1 – Indirectly heated triode, British 7-pin base
- 7A3 – Indirectly heated power pentode, British 7-pin base
- 8A1 – Indirectly heated RF sharp-cutoff pentode, British 5-pin base with anode top cap
- 9A1 – Indirectly heated RF/IF remote-cutoff pentode, British 5-pin base with anode top cap
- 10D1 – Indirectly heated, common-cathode dual diode, British 5-pin base
- 11A2 – Indirectly heated, common-cathode dual diode and triode, British 7-pin base
- 13D3 – Indirectly heated, common-cathode dual triode, Noval base
- 15A2 – Indirectly heated, heptode pentagrid converter, British 7-pin base
- 20D4 – Indirectly heated, triode/heptode frequency mixer, Noval base

==== Valvo system before 1934 ====
Valvo^{(de, it)} was a major German electronic components manufacturer from 1924 to 1989; a Philips subsidiary since 1927, Valvo was one of the predecessors of NXP Semiconductors.

The system consisted of one or two letters followed by 3 or 4 digits. It was phased out after 1934 when Valvo adopted the Mullard–Philips scheme.

First letter(s): Type

- A – Triode
- AN – Binode, a diode/triode or diode/tetrode
- G – Rectifier
- H – RF tube
- L – Power tube
- LK – Power amplifier
- U – Triode with a space charge grid
- W – Triode for resistor-coupled amplifiers
- X – Hexode

Number:

- If the first digit is 4, the tube has a 4 V heater
- Otherwise, the last two digits give the heater current in tens of mA.

A following letter D indicates more than one grid, not counting a space charge grid

Examples:

- A2118 = B2038 = REN1821 = R2018 – Triode, 180 mA (=18×10 mA) heater
- H2018D = B2042 = RENS1820 = S2018 – RF Tetrode, 180 mA heater
- L496D = E443H = RES964 = PP4101 – Power pentode, 4 V heater
- L2318D = B2043 = RENS1823D = PP2018D – Power pentode, 180 mA heater

=== East European systems ===
==== Lamina transmitting tubes system ====
Polish Lamina^{(pl)} transmitting tube designations consist of one or two letters, a group of digits and an optional letter and/or two digits preceded by a "/" sign.

The first letter indicates the tube type, two equal letters denoting a dual tube:

- P – Pentode
- Q – Tetrode
- T – Triode

A group of digits represents the maximum anode power dissipation in kW

An optional letter specifies the cooling method:

- <none> – Radiation
- P – Forced air
- W – Water

The first of the two digits after the "/" sign means:

- 1 – Tube for radio broadcasting and radiocommunication equipment
- 2 – Tube for industrial equipment
- 3 – Tube used in TV broadcasting equipment
- 4 – Tube for radiocommunication equipment with unbalanced modulation
- 5 – Modulator or pulse tube

The second digit after the "/" is sequentially assigned.

Examples:

- Q01 – Power tetrode up to 125 MHz, 0.1 kW (=100 W)
- Q3.5 – Power tetrode up to 220 MHz, 3.5 kW
- QQ-004/11 – Dual beam power tetrode up to 500 MHz, 0.04 kW (=40 W)
- T01 – Power triode up to 200 MHz, 135 W
- T015/21 – Power triode up to 150 MHz, 150 W
- T02 – Power triode up to 60 MHz, 200 W
- T05P/31 – Forced air cooled power triode up to 1 GHz, 1 kW
- T2/22 – Power triode up to 60 MHz, 3 kW
- T6 – Power triode up to 30 MHz, 6 kW
- T8P/21 – Forced air cooled power triode up to 120 MHz, 8 kW
- T10P/22 – Power triode up to 30 MHz, 10 kW
- T-25P – Forced air cooled power triode up to 30 MHz, 25 kW
- T60W/21 – Water cooled power triode up to 30 MHz, 6 kW

==== RFT transmitting tubes system ====
Rundfunk- und Fernmelde-Technik^{(de, sv)} was the brand of a group of telecommunications manufacturers in the German Democratic Republic. The designation consists of a group of three letters and a group of three or four digits.

The first two letters determine the tube type:

- GR – Rectifier tube
- SR – Transmitter tube
- VR – Amplifier tube

The third letter specifies the cooling method:

- L – Forced air
- S – Radiation
- V – Vapor (the anode is immersed in evaporating water, and the steam is collected, condensed and recycled)
- W – Water

The first digit (or the first two digits in double tubes) indicates the number of electrodes:

- 2 – Diode
- 3 – Triode
- 4 – Tetrode
- 5 – Pentode

The last two digits are sequentially assigned.

Examples:

- SRS301 – Radiation-cooled triode up to 40 MHz, 900 W
- SRS464 – Radiation-cooled, vibration-resistant pulse tetrode up to 300 kW
- SRS4451 – Radiation-cooled dual tetrode up to 500 MHz, 60 W
- SRS4452 = QQE03/20 = 6252 – Radiation-cooled dual tetrode up to 600 MHz, 20 W
- SRS4452 – Radiation-cooled dual tetrode up to 600 MHz, 20 W
- SRS501 – Radiation-cooled pentode up to 50 MHz, 100 W
- SRS552N = ГУ-50 – Radiation-cooled pentode up to 120 MHz, 50 W
- VRS303 – Radiation-cooled AF triode, 1 kW
- VRS328 – Radiation-cooled AF triode, 150 W
- VRS331 – Radiation-cooled AF triode, 450 W

Note: RFT used the Mullard–Philips and RETMA schemes for their low-power tubes.

==== Tesla systems (Czechoslovakia) ====
===== Signal tubes =====
Besides the genuine Mullard–Philips system, Tesla also used an M-P/RETMA hybrid scheme:

First number: Heater voltage, as in the RETMA system

Next letter(s): Type, subset of the Mullard–Philips system

Next digit: Base

- 1 – Octal K8A
- 2 – Loctal B8G
- 3 – Miniature 7-pin B7G
- 4 – Noval B9A
- 5 – Special, mostly 9 out of 10 1.25mm pins on a 25mm-diameter circle
- 6 – Submagnal B11A
- 7 – Duodecal B12A
- 8 – Diheptal B14A
- 9 – Wire-ends

Last digit: Sequentially assigned number

Examples:

- 1M90 (DM70/1M3) – Subminiature indicator tube, 1.4V/25 mA filament, all-glass wire-ended
- 1Y32 – Miniature 7-pin High-voltage directly heated rectifier with 1.4 V/265 mA WTh filament. Type 1Y32T has oxide cathode.
- 4L20 – Directly heated RF power pentode; center-tapped 4.2 V/325 mA filament; Soviet 4P1L (4П1Л), German RL4,2P6 with Loctal base
- 6B31 – Dual diode up to 700 MHz; 6.3V/300mA heater, miniature 7-pin base
- 6BC32 (6AV6, EBC91) – Dual diode and triode; 6.3V/300mA heater, miniature 7-pin base
- 6CC31 (6J6, ECC91) – 600 MHz dual triode; 6.3V/450mA heater, miniature 7-pin base
- 6CC42 (2C51) – VHF dual triode; 6.3V/350mA heater, noval base
- 6F24 – Telecom pentode, 6.3V/450mA heater, Loctal base
- 6F36 (6AH6) – Sharp-cutoff IF/video pentode, 6.3V/450mA heater, miniature 7-pin base
- 6H31 (6BE6, EK90) – Heptode mixer; 6.3V/300mA heater, miniature 7-pin base
- 6L36 (6AQ5, EL90) – Power pentode, 6.3V/450mA heater, miniature 7-pin base
- 6L41 (5763) – Beam tetrode, 6.3V/750mA heater, noval base
- 35Y31 – Half-wave rectifier, 35V/150mA series heater; UY1N with miniature 7-pin base

===== Power tubes =====
First letter:

- R – Rectifier or RF tube
- U – Gas-filled power rectifier
- Z – Modulator tube

Next letter(s): Type, subset of the Mullard–Philips scheme

Next number: Anode dissipation in W (if radiation cooled) or kW (otherwise)

The next letter specifies the cooling method:

- <none> – Radiation
- V – Vapor
- X – Forced air
- Y – Water

Examples:

- RA0007B – Directly heated saturated-emission ballast diode. Acts as a heating current-controlled, variable series resistor in voltage/current stabilizer circuits; U_{Amax} 600 V I_{Amax} 700 μA, noval base
- RA100A – 40 kV, 100 mA Half-wave rectifier with an E40 Goliath Edison screw lamp base and an anode top cap
- RC5B – Cup-type UHF power triode up to 5 W
- RD27AS – Radiation-cooled power triode up to 25 MHz, 27 W
- RD200B – Radiation-cooled power triode up to 60 MHz, 200 W
- RD300S – Radiation-cooled power triode up to 200 MHz, 300 W
- RD150YA – Water-cooled power triode up to 3 MHz, 150 kW
- RE40AK = KT88
- RE65A – Radiation-cooled beam tetrode up to 260 MHz, 65 W
- RE125C – Radiation-cooled beam tetrode up to 235 MHz, 125 W
- RE400C – Radiation-cooled beam tetrode up to 235 MHz, 400 W
- RE20XL – Air-cooled beam tetrode up to 220 MHz, 20 kW
- REE30A – Radiation-cooled dual beam tetrode up to 250 MHz, 20 W
- RL15A – Radiation-cooled power pentode up to 60 MHz, 20 W
- RL40A – Radiation-cooled power pentode up to 120 MHz, 40 W
- RL65A – Radiation-cooled power pentode up to 15 MHz, 65 W
- UA025A – 10 kV, 250 mA Argon-filled, half-wave rectifier with an E27 Edison screw lamp base and an anode screw top cap
- UA5A – 11 kV, 5 A Half-wave mercury-vapor rectifier with a 2-pin base and an anode screw top cap
- ZD1000F – Radiation-cooled power triode up to 60 MHz, 1 kW
- ZD1XB – Air-cooled AF power triode up to 1.2 kW
- ZD3XH – Air-cooled power triode up to 60 MHz, 3 kW
- ZD8XA – Air-cooled power triode up to 20 MHz, 8 kW
- ZD12YA – Air-cooled AF power triode up to 20 MHz, 12 kW
- ZE025XS – Air-cooled beam tetrode up to 400 MHz, 250 W

==== Tungsram receiving tubes system before 1934 ====
The Tungsram system was composed of a maximum of three letters and three or four digits. It was phased out after 1934 when Tungsram adopted the Mullard–Philips scheme, frequently preceding it with the letter T, as in TAD1 for AD1.

Letter: System type:

Note: A preceding letter A indicates an indirectly heated tube

- D – Detector diode
- DD – Dual diode
- DG – Tetrode with a space charge grid (the 2nd grid is the control grid)
- DS – Diode-tetrode
- FH – Remote-cutoff hexode pentagrid converter
- G – Preamplifier triode
- H – Voltage amplifier triode or grid-leak detector
- HP – RF pentode
- HR – RF triode
- L – AF power triode
- MH – Hexode pentagrid converter
- MO – Octode pentagrid converter
- O – Transmitting tube
- P – Power triode
- PP – Power pentode
- PV – Full-wave rectifier
- R – High-Mu triode
- S – Tetrode
- V – Half-wave rectifier
- X – US-licensed tube

Number:

- First digit (or the first two digits): Heater voltage
- Remaining digits: Heater current in tens of mA, but the last digit is sequentially assigned

Examples:

- AS4100 – Tetrode, 4 V, 1 A (=100×10 mA) indirect heater
- FH4105 = E449 = RENS1234 – Indirectly heated remote-cutoff hexode, 4 V, 1.2 A heater
- HP4101 = E446 = RENS1284 – RF pentode, 4 V, 1 A filament
- HP4106 = E447 = RENS1294 – Indirectly heated remote-cutoff RF pentode, 4 V, 1.1 A heater
- HR406 = A425 = RE034 – RF triode, 4 V, 60 mA (=6×10 mA) filament
- L414 = B409 = RE134 – Triode, 4 Volt, 140 mA (=14×10 mA) filament
- MH2018 = B2048 = RENS1824 – Hexode mixer, 20 V, 180 mA (=18×10 mA) heater
- MH4100 = E448 = RENS1224 – Indirectly heated sharp-cutoff hexode frequency changer, 4 V, 1.2 A heater
- PP2018D = B2043 = RENS1823D = L2318D – Indirectly heated power pentode, 20 V, 180 mA DC series heater
- PP4101 = E443H = RES964 = L496D – Power pentode, 4 V heater
- PV4200 – Full-wave rectifier, 4 V, 2 A (=200×10 mA) filament
- R2018 = B2038 = REN1821 = A2118 – Triode, 180 mA heater
- S406 = A442 = RES094 – Directly heated tetrode with a screen grid, 4 V, 60 mA filament
- S2018 = B2042 = RENS1820 = H2018D – RF Tetrode, 180 mA heater

=== Russian systems ===
Vacuum tubes produced in the former Soviet Union and in present-day Russia are designated in Cyrillic. Some confusion has been created in transliterating these designations to Latin.

The first system was introduced in 1929. It consisted of one or two letters (designating system type and, optionally, type of cathode), a dash, then a sequentially assigned number with up to 3 digits.

In 1937, the Soviet Union purchased a tube assembly line from RCA (who at the time had difficulties raising funds for their basic operations), including production licenses and initial staff training, and installed it on the Svetlana/Светлана plant in St. Petersburg, Russia. US-licensed tubes were produced since then under an adapted RETMA scheme.

Examples:

- 6Ф5 = 6F5 – High-mu triode
- 6Ф6 = 6F6 – Power pentode
- 6Х6 = 6H6 – Dual diode
- 6Ж7 = 6J7/EF37 – Sharp-cutoff pentode
- 6Л6 = 6L6 – Beam tetrode
- 6Л7 = 6L7 – Pentagrid converter
- 6Н7 = 6N7 – Dual power triode

==== GOST standard tubes system ====
In the 1950s a 5-element system (Russian: Государственный Стандарт "State standard" ГОСТ/GOST 5461–59, later 13393–76) was adopted in the (then) Soviet Union for designating receiver vacuum tubes.

The first element is a number specifying filament voltage. The second element is a Cyrillic letter specifying the type of device. The third element is a sequentially assigned number that distinguishes between different devices of the same type. The fourth element denotes the type of envelope. An optional fifth element consists of a dash followed by one or more characters to designate special characteristics of the tube. This usually implies construction differences, not just selection from regular quality production.

==== Professional tubes system ====
There is another designation system for professional tubes such as transmitter ones.

The first element designates function. The next elements varies in interpretation. For ignitrons, rectifiers, and thyratrons, there is a digit, then a dash, then the anode current in amperes, a slash, anode voltage in kV. A letter may be attached to designate water cooling (no letter designates a radiation cooled device). For transmitting tubes in this system, the second element starts with a dash, a sequentially assigned number, then an optional letter specifying cooling method. For phototubes and photomultipliers, the second element is a sequential number and then a letter code identifying vacuum or gas fill and the type of cathode.

=== Japanese systems ===
==== Older numbering system 1930s–40s ====
A letter: Structure and usage

- E – Electron ray tube
- K – Kenotron (rectifier)
- U – General-purpose tube

Then a letter: Base and outline

- N – Wire-ended (Acorn tubes, etc.)
- S – Octal K8A
- T – Large 7-pin U7B, ST
- t – Small 7-pin U7A, ST
- V – 4-pin UV4
- X – 4-pin UX4, ST
- x – Peanut 4-pin
- Y – 5-pin UY5, ST
- y – Peanut 5-pin
- Z – 6-pin U6A, ST

Then a dash, followed by a sequentially assigned number or the designation of the American original

Then an optional dash, followed by a letter: Version

Examples:

- EZ-6G5 = 6G5 – Variable-mu "Magic Eye"-type tuning indicator
- KX-80-B – Kenotron
- UN-954 = 954 – Acorn sharp-cutoff pentode
- UN-955 = 955 – Acorn triode
- US-6A8 = 6A8 – Pentagrid converter
- US-6L7G = 6L7G – Pentagrid converter
- UX-26-B – Medium-mu RF triode
- UX-167 – Sharp-cutoff RF pentode
- UY-47B – Pentode
- UZ-58-A – Remote-cutoff RF/IF pentode

==== JIS C 7001 system ====
JIS C 7001 was published in 1951 and modified in 1965 and 1970

A number: Heater voltage range, as in the RETMA scheme

- 1 – 1 V ≤ U_{f} < 2 V
- 2 – 2 V ≤ U_{f} < 2.5 V
- 3 – 2.5 V ≤ U_{f} < 4 V
- 4 – 4 V ≤ U_{f} < 5 V
- 5 – 5 V ≤ U_{f} < 6 V
- 6 – 6 V ≤ U_{f} < 7 V

etc.

Then a letter: Base and Outline

- A – Special base
- B – Other
- C – Compactron (Duodecar)
- D – Subminiature round base
- E – Subminiature flat base
- F – European 4-pin, ST
- G – Octal base glass tube (GT)
- H – Magnoval
- K – Ceramic
- L – Loctal
- M – Miniature 7-pin
- N – Nuvistor
- Q – Acorn tube
- R – Noval or Neonoval
- S – Octal
- T – Large 7-pin U7B, ST
- W – Small 7-pin U7A, ST
- X – 4-pin UX4, ST
- Y – 5-pin UY5, ST
- Z – 6-pin U6A, ST

Then a dash, followed by a letter: Structure and usage

- A – Power triode
- B – Beam power tube
- C – Pentagrid converter
- D – Diode
- E – Optical tuning/level indicator
- G – Gas-filled rectifier
- H – High-mu triode (μ>30)
- K – Kenotron (rectifier)

- Even number after K: Full-wave rectifier
- Odd number after K: Half-wave rectifier

- L – Low-mu triode (μ<30)
- P – Power tetrode or pentode
- R – Sharp-cutoff tetrode or pentode
- S – Tetrode with a space charge grid (the 2nd grid is the control grid)
- T – Gas-filled, grid-controlled
- V – Variable-mu (remote-cutoff) tetrode and pentode
- X – Other

Then a sequentially assigned number

Then an optional letter: Version

Examples:

- 2N-H12 – Nuvistor
- 2X-L2A – Low-mu triode
- 6C-A10 – Power triode
- 6G-A4 – Power triode
- 6G-B8 – Beam power tube
- 6G-E12A – 2-channel "Magic Eye"-type tuning indicator, rectangular target
- 6H-B26 – Beam power tube
- 6M-DE1 – Diode and "Magic Eye"-type tuning indicator, miniature 7-pin base
- 6M-E4 – "Magic Finger"-type tuning indicator, miniature 7-pin base
- 6M-E5 = 6ME5 – "Magic Eye"-type tuning indicator, miniature 7-pin base
- 6M-E10 – "Magic Eye"-type tuning indicator, miniature 7-pin base
- 6N-H10 – Nuvistor
- 6R-A8 – Power triode
- 6R-B10 – Beam power tube
- 6R-B11 – Beam power tube

=== Military naming systems ===
==== British CV and M8000s naming systems ====
This system prefixes a three- or four-digit number with the letters "CV", meaning "civilian valve" i.e. common to all three armed services. It was introduced during the Second World War to rationalise the previous nomenclatures maintained separately by the War Office/Ministry of Supply, Admiralty and Air Ministry/Ministry of Aircraft Production on behalf of the three armed services (e.g. "ACR~", "AR~", "AT~", etc. for CRTs, receiving and transmitting valves used in army equipments, "NC~", "NR~" and "NT~" similarly for navy equipments and "VCR~", "VR~" and "VT~" etc. for air force equipments), in which three separate designations could in principle apply to the same valve (which often had at least one prototype commercial designation as well). These numbers generally have identical equivalents in both the North American, RETMA, and West European, Mullard–Philips, systems but they bear no resemblance to the assigned "CV" number.

Examples:

- CV1988 = 6SN7GT = ECC32 (not a direct equivalent as heater current is different and bulb is larger)
- CV2729 = E80F – An SQ version of EF80 but with revised pin-out and a base screen substituted for the RF screen

The "CV4000" numbers identify special-quality valves though SQ valves CV numbered before that rule came in retain their original CV number:

- CV4007 = E91AA – SQ version of 6AL5
- CV4010 = E95F – SQ version of 6AK5 or EF95
- CV4014 = M8083

The "M8" in the part number denotes that it was developed by the military:

- M8083 – Sharp-cutoff pentode, miniature 7-pin base (SQ version of EF91 = 6AM6 = Z77)
- M8162 = 6060 – High-mu dual triode, for use as RF amplifier/mixer in VHF circuits, Noval base (SQ versions of ECC81 = 12AT7 = B309)

The principle behind the CV numbering scheme was also adopted by the US Joint Army-Navy JAN numbering scheme which was later considerably expanded into the US Federal and then NATO Stock Number system used by all NATO countries. This part-identification system ensures that every particular spare part (not merely thermionic valves) receives a unique stock number across the whole of NATO irrespective of the source, and hence is not held inefficiently as separate stores. In the case of CV valves, the stock number is always of the format 5960-99-000-XXXX where XXXX is the CV number (with a leading 0 if the CV number only has 3 digits).

==== U.S. naming systems ====
One system prefixes a three-digit number with the letters "VT", presumably meaning "Vacuum Tube". Other systems prefix the number with the letters "JHS" or "JAN". The numbers following these prefixes can be "special" four-digit numbers, or domestic two- or three-digit numbers or simply the domestic North American "RETMA" numbering system. Like the British military system, these have many direct equivalents in the civilian types. Confusingly, the British also had two entirely different "VT" nomenclatures, one used by the Royal Air Force (see the preceding section) and the other used by the General Post Office, responsible for post and telecommunications at the time, where it may have stood for "valve, telephone"; none of these schemes corresponded in any way with each other.

Examples:

- "VT" numbering systems

- North American VT90 = 6H6
- British (RAF) VT90 – VHF Transmitting triode
- British (GPO) VT90 = ML4 = CV1732 – Power triode
- VT104 – RF pentode
- VT105 – RF triode

=== Other numeral-only systems ===
Various numeral-only systems exist. These tend to be used for devices used in commercial or industrial equipment. The oldest numbering systems date back to the early 1920s, such as a two-digit numbering system, starting with the UV-201A, which was considered as "type 01", and extended almost continuously up into the 1980s. Three- and four-digit numeral-only systems were maintained by R.C.A., but also adopted by many other manufacturers, and typically encompassed rectifiers and radio transmitter output devices. Devices in the low 800s tend to be transmitter output types, those in the higher 800s are not vacuum tubes, but gas-filled rectifiers and thyratrons, and those in the 900s tend to be special-purpose and high-frequency devices. Use was not rigorously systematic: the 807 had variants 1624, 1625, and 807W.

=== Other letter followed by numerals ===
There are quite a number of these systems from different geographical realms, such as those used on devices from contemporary Russian and Chinese production. Other compound numbering systems were used to mark higher-reliability types used in industrial or commercial applications. Computers and telecommunication equipment also required tubes of greater quality and reliability than for domestic and consumer equipment.

Some letter prefixes are manufacturer's codes:

- C – RCA/Cunningham
- CK, QK, RK – Raytheon Company
- ECG – Philips/Sylvania
- EM – Eitel McCullough
- F – Federal Telephone and Radio
- GE, GL – General Electric Corp. (not British General Electric Company)
- HK – Heintz & Kaufman, Ltd. (San Francisco, California, USA)
- HY – CBS/Hytron
- ML – Machlett Laboratories, Inc.
- NL – National Electronics, Inc.
- NU – National Union Electric Corp.
- PL – Philips N.V.
- RCA – RCA/Radiotron
- SV – Svetlana/Светлана
- SY – Standard Telephones and Cables Ltd./Brimar
- TH – Compagnie Française Thomson-Houston
- WE – Western Electric Company
- WL – Westinghouse Electric Corp.
- XD – Central Electronic Manufacturers (Denville, New Jersey, USA)

For examples, see below

Some designations are derived from the behavior of devices considered to be exceptional.

- Mazda/EdiSwan sold their first tubes for 4-volts AC mains transformer (as opposed to home storage battery) heating with the prefix AC/ (for examples see below).
- The first beam tetrodes manufactured in the UK in the late 1930s by M-OV, carried a "KT" prefix meaning Kinkless Tetrode (for examples see above).

== List of American RETMA tubes ==
Note: Typecode explained above. See also RETMA tube designation

=== "0 volt" gas-filled cold cathode tubes ===
First character is numeric zero, not letter O.

==== Voltage stabilisers and references ====
Function in a similar way to a Zener diode, at higher voltages. Letter order (A-B-C) indicates increasing voltage ratings on octal-based regulators and decreasing voltage ratings on miniature-based regulators.

- 0A2 – 150 volt regulator, 7-pin miniature base
- 0A3 – 75 volt regulator, octal base, aka VR75
- 0B2 – 105 volt regulator, 7-pin miniature base
- 0B3 – 90 volt regulator, octal base, aka VR90
- 0C2 – 75 volt regulator, 7-pin miniature base
- 0C3 – 105 volt regulator, octal base, aka VR105
- 0D3 – 150 volt regulator, octal base, aka VR150

==== Other cold-cathode tubes ====
- 0A4G – 25 mA_{avg}, 100mA_{peak} Gas triode designed for use as a ripple control receiver; with the cathode tied to the midpoint of a series-resonance LC circuit across live mains, it would activate a relay in its anode circuit while f_{res} is present
- 0Y4 – 40 ≤ I ≤ 75 mA Half-wave gas rectifier with a starter anode, 5-pin octal base
- 0Z4 – 30 ≤ I ≤ 90 mA Argon-filled, full-wave gas rectifier, octal base. Widely used in vibrator power supplies in early automobile radio receivers.

=== 1 volt heater/filament tubes ===
==== 1.25 volt DC filament subminiature tubes ====
The following tubes were used in post-World War II walkie-talkies and pocket-sized portable radios. All have 1.25 volt DC filaments and directly heated cathodes. Some specify which end of the filament is to be powered by the positive side of the filament power supply (usually a battery). All have glass bodies that measure from 0.285 to 0.400 inches (7.2 to 10.2 millimetres) wide, and from 1.25 to 2.00 inches (32 to 51 millimetres) in overall length.

- 1C8 – Pentagrid converter, R8
- 1D3 – Low-mu high-frequency triode, R8
- 1E8 – Pentagrid converter, R8
- 1Q6 – Diode, pentode, R8
- 1S6 – Diode, pentode, R8
- 1T6 – Diode, pentode, R8
- 1V5 – Power pentode, R8
- 1V6 – Triode-pentode converter, FL
- 1W5 – Sharp-cutoff pentode, R8
- 1AC5 – Power pentode, FL
- 1AD4 – Sharp-cutoff pentode, FL
- 1AD5 – Sharp-cutoff pentode, R8
- 1AE5 – Heptode mixer, FL
- 1AG4 – Power pentode, FL
- 1AG5 – Diode, pentode, FL
- 1AH4 – RF pentode, FL
- 1AJ5 – Diode, sharp-cutoff pentode, FL
- 1AK4 – Sharp-cutoff pentode, FL
- 1AK5 – Diode, sharp-cutoff pentode, FL

==== 1.4 volt DC filament tubes ====
- 1A3 – High frequency diode with indirectly heated cathode. Used as a detector in some portable AM/FM receivers.
- 1A7GT/DK32 – Pentagrid converter, re-engineered version of types 1A6 and 1D7-G, designed for use in portable AC/DC/Dry-cell battery radios introduced in 1938. Has 1.4 V/50 mA filament.
- 1B7-GT – Re-engineered version of types 1C6 and 1C7-G, designed for use in dry-cell battery radios with shortwave bands. Has 1.4 V/100 mA filament
- 1G6-G – Dual power triode. "GT" version also available.
- 1L6 – Pentagrid frequency changer for battery radios with 50 mA filament
- 1LA6 (Loctal) and later 1L6 (7-pin miniature) – Battery pentagrid converter for Zenith Trans-Oceanic shortwave radio, 50 mA filament
- 1LB6 – Superheterodyne mixer for battery-operated radios
- 1LC6 – Similar to type 1LA6, but with higher conversion transconductance
- 1R5/DK91 – Pentagrid converter, anode voltage in the 45...90 volt range.
- 1S4 – Power output pentode Class-A amplifier, anode voltage in the 45...90 volt range.
- 1S5 – Sharp-cutoff pentode Class-A amplifier, and diode, used as detector and first A.F. stage in battery radio receivers. Anode voltage in the 67...90 volt range.
- 1T4/DF91 – Remote-cutoff R.F. Pentode Class-A amplifier, Miniature 7-pin base, used as R.F. and I.F. amplifier in battery radio receivers.
- 1U4 – Sharp-cutoff R.F. Pentode Class-A amplifier, Miniature 7-pin base, used as R.F. and I.F. amplifier in battery radio receivers, similar characteristics to 6BA6.
- 1U6 – Nearly identical to type 1L6, but with a 1.4 V/25 mA filament

==== "1" prefix for home receivers ====
These tubes were made for home storage battery receivers manufactured during the early to mid-1930s; all have 2.0 volt DC filaments despite the 1-prefix, intended to distinguish them from the 2.5 volt AC heated tubes listed below

- 1A4-p – Remote-cutoff pentode
- 1A4-t – Remote-cutoff tetrode
- 1A6 – Pentagrid converter up to only 10 MHz due to low heater power (2 V/60 mA) and consequent low emission in the oscillator section; also occasionally used as a grid-leak detector
- 1B4-p – Sharp-cutoff pentode
- 1B4-t – Sharp-cutoff tetrode
- 1B5 – Dual detector diode, medium-mu triode. Usually numbered 1B5/25S
- 1C5 – Power pentode (similar to 3Q5 except for filament)
- 1C6 – Pentagrid converter; 1A6, with double the heater power and double the frequency range
- 1C7-G – Octal version of type 1C6.
- 1D5-Gp – Octal version of type 1A4-p.
- 1D5-Gt – Octal version of type 1A4-t. (Note: This is a shouldered "G" octal, not a cylindrical "GT" octal.)
- 1D7-G – Octal version of type 1A6.
- 1E5-Gp – Octal version of type 1B4-p.
- 1E5-Gt – Octal version of type 1B4-t. (Note: This is a shouldered "G" octal, not a cylindrical "GT" octal.)
- 1E7-G – Dual power pentode for use as a driver when parallel-connected, or as a push-pull output. "GT" version also available
- 1F4 – Power pentode
- 1F5-G – Octal version of 1F4.
- 1F6 – Duplex diode, sharp-cutoff pentode
- 1F7-G – Octal version of type 1F6
- 1G4-GT/G – Octal triode, mu 8.8
- 1G5-G – Power pentode
- 1H4-G – Medium-mu triode, can be used as a power triode. Octal version of type 30, which is an upgraded version of type 01-A. "GT" version also available.
- 1H6-G – Octal version of type 1B5/25S. "GT" version also available.
- 1J5-G (950) – AF Power pentode
- 1J6-G – Dual power triode, octal version of type 19. "GT" version also available.

==== CRT anode rectifiers ====
- 1G3GT – Octal High-voltage rectifier. Same Characteristics as 1B3GT. Many listed and labeled as 1B3GT/1G3GT.
- 1H2 – Noval High-voltage rectifier with 1.4 V/550 mA filament
- 1J3GT – Octal High-voltage rectifier. Same Characteristics as 1B3GT. Has filament-plate shorting protection. Many listed and labeled as 1J3GT/1K3GT.
- 1K3GT – Octal High-voltage rectifier. Same Characteristics as 1B3GT. Has filament-plate shorting protection. Many listed and labeled as 1J3GT/1K3GT.
- 1S2A – Noval High-voltage rectifier with 1.4 V/550 mA filament. Similar to DY86, DY87, DY802, 1R10, and 1R12.
- 1T2 = R16 – Subminiature High-voltage rectifier with 1.4 V/140 mA filament. Has flexible leads.
- 1V2 – High-voltage rectifier with 0.625 V/300 mA filament, Miniature 7-pin base
- 1X2 – Noval High-voltage rectifier with 1.25 V/200 mA filament. 1X2A, 1X2B and 1X2C have X-Radiation Shielding. Similar to DY80 and R19.
- 1Y2 – 4 pin High-voltage rectifier with 1.5 V/290 mA filament. 50KV max PIV, 10mA peak, 2mA average. Usable up to 1 MHz.
- 1Z1 – Octal High-voltage rectifier with 0.7 V/180 mA filament.
- 1Z2 – Noval High-voltage rectifier with 1.25 V/265 mA filament.
- 1AD2 – Compactron High-voltage rectifier with 1.25 V/200 mA filament. Type 1AD2A has X-Radiation Shielding.
- 1AJ2 – Compactron High-voltage rectifier with 1.25 V/200 mA filament
- 1AY2 – 2-pin "Duopin" base High-voltage rectifier. Has similar electrical characteristics as 1B3GT.
- 1B3GT – Octal High-voltage rectifier diode with 1.25 V filament common in monochrome TV receivers of the 1950s and early 1960s. Peak inverse voltage of 30 kV. Anode current 2 mA average, 17 mA peak. Derived from the earlier industrial type 8016. Many listed and labeled as 1B3GT/1G3GT.
- 1BC2 – Noval High-voltage rectifier with 1.25 V/200 mA filament. Types 1BC2A and 1BC2B have X-Radiation Shielding.
- 1BG2 – Subminiature High-voltage rectifier with 1.4 V/575 mA filament. Has flexible leads.
- 1BQ2 – Noval High-voltage rectifier with 1.4 V/600 mA filament
- 1BY2 – Compactron High-voltage rectifier with 1.25 V/200 mA filament. Type 1BY2A has X-Radiation Shielding.

=== 2 volt heater/filament tubes ===
==== 2.5 volt AC heater tubes ====
Tubes used in AC-powered radio receivers of the early 1930s

- 2A3 – Directly heated power triode, used for AF output stages in 1930s–1940s audio amplifiers and radios.
- 2A5 – Power Pentode (Except for heater, electronically identical to types 42 and 6F6)
- 2A6 – Dual diode, high-mu triode (Except for heater, electronically identical to type 75)
- 2A7 – Dual-tetrode-style pentagrid converter (Except for heater, electronically identical to types 6A7, 6A8 and 12A8)
- 2B7 – Dual diode and remote-cutoff pentode (Except for heater, electronically identical to type 6B7)
- 2E5 and 2G5 – Electron-ray indicators ("Eye tube") with integrated control triode. (Except for heater, electronically identical to types 6E5 and 6G5)

==== CRT anode rectifiers ====
- 2X2 – High Vacuum High Peak inverse voltage diode, used as rectifier in CRT EHT supplies. Similar to 1B3 and 1S2 except for heater voltage.

=== 3 volt heater/filament tubes ===
- 3A3/3B2/3AW3 - High Voltage rectifier. An octal type used in color television sets. The heater power is 3.15 volts and 0.22 amps.
- 3CA3 - High Voltage rectifier. An octal type used in color television sets. The heater power is 3.6 volts and 0.225 amps.
- 3CN3 - High Voltage rectifier. An octal type used in color television sets. The heater power is 3.15 volts and 0.48 amps. The large current is for the advantage of fast warm-up.
- 3CU3 - High Voltage rectifier. An octal type used in color television sets. The heater power is 3.15 volts and 0.28 amps.
- 3CZ3 - High Voltage rectifier. An octal type used in color television sets. The heater power is 3.15 volts and 0.48 amps. The large current is for the advantage of fast warm-up.
- 3AT2 - High Voltage rectifier. A compactron used in television sets to supply power to the anode of the picture tube. It comes in the variation as the 3AT2B, mainly for color television sets with a large picture tube. The 3AT2B comes with X-radiation shielding on the inside. The heater power is 3.15 volts and 0.22 amps.
- 3AW2 - High Voltage rectifier. A compactron used for color and black and white television sets. It comes in the variation as the 3AW2A as a replacement for the 3AW2 after the 1967 General Electric X-radiation scandal. The 3AW2A comes with X-radiation shielding on the inside. The heater power is 3.15 volts and 0.22 amps.
- 3BF2 - High Voltage rectifier. A compactron used in television sets to supply power to the anode of the picture tube. This tube is very rare, and very special, because it implements an indirectly heated cathode, not connected to the filament. No data is found on this tube, except for the filament power (which is 3.6 volts, 0.225 amps) and the base (which is the 12GQ type). The only reason why we know it is a high voltage rectifier is that the base tells us so.
- 3BL2 - High Voltage rectifier. A compactron used in television sets to supply power to the anode of the picture tube. It comes in the variation as the 3BL2A as a replacement for the 3BL2 after the 1967 General Electric X-radiation scandal. The 3BL2A comes with X-radiation shielding on the inside. The heater power is 3.3 volts and 0.285 amps.
- 3BM2 - High Voltage rectifier. A compactron used in television sets to supply power to the anode of the picture tube. It comes in the variation as the 3BM2A as a replacement for the 3BM2 after the 1967 General Electric X-radiation scandal. The 3BM2A comes with X-radiation shielding on the inside. The heater power is 3 volts and 0.3 amps.
- 3BN2 - High Voltage rectifier. A compactron used for color television sets. It comes in the variation as the 3BN2A as a replacement for the 3BN2 after the 1967 General Electric X-radiation scandal. The 3BN2A comes with X-radiation shielding on the inside. The heater power is 3.15 volts and 0.22 amps.
- 3BS2 - High Voltage rectifier. A compactron used for color television sets. It comes in the variation as the 3BS2A and 3BS2B as a replacement for the 3BN2 after the 1967 General Electric X-radiation scandal. The 3BS2A and 3BS2B tubes are identical, maybe a small difference in ratings and characteristics. We do not know these differences as the 3BS2B tube data is not available. The 3BS2A and 3BS2B comes with X-radiation shielding on the inside. The heater power is 3.15 volts and 0.48 amps. The large current is for the advantage of fast warm-up.
- 3BT2 - High Voltage rectifier. A compactron used for color television sets. It comes in the variation as the 3BT2A as a replacement for the 3BT2 after the 1967 General Electric X-radiation scandal. The 3BT2A comes with X-radiation shielding on the inside. The heater power is 3.15 volts and 0.48 amps. The large current is for the advantage of fast warm-up.
- 3BW2 - High Voltage rectifier. A compactron used for color and black and white television sets. The 3BW2 comes with X-radiation shielding on the inside. It also comes with diffusion bonded cathode (a type of cathode that prevents the back-emission of the anode). This tube was designed in December 1970, after the 1967 General Electric X-radiation scandal. All high voltage rectifier tube types that were designed before 1967 had no X-radiation protection internally. That is why all these tubes made during and after 1967 have a suffix showing they had internal X-radiation protection. This is why there is no '3BW2A' type since it was made after 1967. The heater power is 3.15 volts and 0.22 amps.

=== 5 volt heater/filament tubes ===
- 5R4 – Full wave rectifier
- 5U4 – Full wave rectifier
- 5V4, GZ32 – Full wave rectifier
- 5Y3 – Full-wave rectifier, octal base version of type 80
- 5AR4, GZ34 – Full wave rectifier
- 5AS4 – Full wave rectifier

=== 6.3 volt heater tubes ===
- 6A6 – Dual Power Triode, used as a Class-A audio driver or a Class-B audio output. U7B base. 6.3 volt heater version of type 53 which had a 2.5 volt heater. Octal version – 6N7.
- 6A7 and 6A8 (PH4, X63) – Pentagrid converter – dual tetrode style. Based on type 2A7, which had a 2.5 volt heater. 6A7 has a UX7 base with top cap connection for control grid (grid 4). 6A8 is octal version with top cap connection for control grid. Loctal version: type 7B8.
- 6B6-G – Dual Diode, High-mu Triode. Octal version of type 75. Has top-cap connection for triode grid. Later octal version, type 6SQ7, has under-chassis connection for triode grid. Miniature version: 6AV6.
- 6B7 (UX7 base), 6B8 (EBF32, Octal base) – Dual Diode, Semiremote-cutoff Pentodes with control grid on top cap. Based on type 2B7 which had a 2.5 volt heater. The diode anodes are most commonly used as (second) detectors and AVC rectification in superheterodyne receivers. Because their control grids have both sharp-cutoff and remote-cutoff characteristics, these types were used as I.F. amplifiers with AVC bias to the control grid, and as A.F. amplifiers. These types were also used in reflex radios. In a typical 2B7/6B7/6B8 reflex circuit, the I.F. signal from the converter is injected into the pentode and is amplified. The diodes then act as detectors, separating the A.F. signal from the R.F. signal. The A.F. signal is then re-injected into the pentode, amplified, and sent to the audio output tube.
- 6C4/EC90 – 3.6 W small-power V.H.F. triode up to 150 MHz; single 12AU7/ECC82 system
- 6C6 – Sharp-cutoff R.F. Pentode. Most common commercial uses were as a tuned R.F. amplifier, a detector, and an A.F. amplifier. Also used in test equipment. Has UX6 base with top cap. Based on type 57, which had a 2.5 volt heater. Similar to types 1603, 77 and octal types 6J7 and 6SJ7
- 6C10 – Compactron High-mu triple triode, 12-pin base – not related to the Mazda/EdiSwan 6C10 triode-hexode
- 6D4 – 25 mA_{avg}, 100 mA_{peak} Indirectly heated, argon triode thyratron, negative starter voltage, miniature 7-pin base; found an additional use as a 0 to 10 MHz noise source, when operated as a diode (starter tied to cathode) in a transverse 375 G magnetic field. Sufficiently filtered for "flatness" ("white noise") in a band of interest, such noise was used for testing radio receivers, servo systems and occasionally in analog computing as a random value source.
- 6D6 – Remote-Cutoff R.F. Pentode. Most common commercial uses were as an I.F. amplifier or as a superheterodyne mixer, aka 1st detector. Also used in test equipment. Has UX6 base with top cap. Based on type 58, which had a 2.5 volt heater. Similar to type 78. Octal version: 6U7-G.
- 6D8-G – Pentagrid converter, similar to type 6A8. Octal base with top cap. Has 150 mA heater. Used in pre-war 6-volt farm radios.
- 6D10 – High-mu triple triode for use as oscillator, mixer, amplifier or AFC tube, 12-pin base
- 6E5 – "Magic Eye" Tuning indicator. Has incorporated driver triode with sharp-cutoff grid which makes it extremely sensitive to any changes in signal strength. Has UX6 base. Based on type 2E5, which had a 2.5 volt heater.
- 6F4 – Acorn UHF triode up to 1.2 GHz, for use as an oscillator
- 6F5 – High-mu triode, equal to triode section of type 6Q7
- 6F6 (KT63) – Power Pentode. Octal base version of type 42. Moderate power output rating – 9 watts max. (Single-ended Class-A circuit); 11 watts max. (Push-pull Class-A circuit); 19 watts max. (push-pull Class-AB_{2} circuit). Available in metal (numbered "6F6"), shouldered glass ("6F6-G"), and cylindrical glass ("6F6-GT"). Sometimes used as a transformer-coupled audio driver for types 6L6-GC and 807 when those tubes were used in Class-AB_{2} or Class-B amplifiers. Also used as a Class-C oscillator/amplifier in transmitters.
- 6F7 – Remote-cutoff Pentode, Medium-mu Triode. Has UX7 base with top-cap connection for the pentode's control grid (grid 1). Most common uses were as superheterodyne mixer ("first detector") and local oscillator, or as a combination I.F. amplifier (pentode) and (second) detector or A.F. amplifier (triode). Octal version: 6P7-G.
- 6G5 – "Magic Eye" Tuning indicator. Has incorporated triode with remote-cutoff grid, which makes it less reactive to low-level changes in signal strength. Has UX6 base. Electronically identical to type 6U5 except for indicator. Both types had "pie wedge" shadow indicators. At first, the shadow indicator for type 6G5 was fully closed at zero signal and opened as signal strength increased. For type 6U5, the shadow indicator was fully open at zero signal and closed as signal strength increased. After World War II, type 6G5 was discontinued as a unique tube and all 6U5s were double-branded either as 6G5/6U5 or 6U5/6G5.
- 6G6-G – Power pentode. Octal base. Low power output – 1.1 watt max. output. Has 150 mA heater. Used in pre-war 6-volt farm radios. Miniature version – 6AK6.
- 6G8-G – Dual Diode, Sharp-cutoff Pentode (Used as Detector and first A.F. stage in Australian 1940s radios)
- 6H6, D63, EB34, OSW3109 – Dual diode. Octal base. Most commonly found as a "stubby" metal envelope tube. Glass versions 6H6-G and 6H6-GT are also found.
- 6J5 (Metal), 6J5GT (Glass Tubular), L63 – Heater cathode type, medium-mu triode, identical to 12J5 except heater characteristics

- 6J5WGT – Premium version of 6J5GT, identical to 12J5WGT except heater characteristics

- 6J6 – Dual general purpose VHF triode with common cathodes, operates over much of the UHF band (up to 600 MHz), equivalent to ECC91
- 6J7, EF37 – Sharp-cutoff Pentode. Most common commercial uses were as a tuned R.F. amplifier, a (second) detector, or an A.F. amplifier. Octal version of type 77. This type included a top-cap connection for the control grid. Later version, type 6SJ7, had its control grid connection on pin 4.
- 6J8-G – Triode-Heptode (radio local oscillator/mixer)
- 6K6-G – Power Pentode, octal version of type 41. Low-to-moderate power output rating – 0.35 to 4.5 watts (single-ended Class-A circuit); 10.5 watts max. (push-pull Class-A circuit).
- 6K7, EF39 – Remote-cutoff R.F. pentode. Most common commercial uses were as an I.F. amplifier or as a superheterodyne mixer, aka 1st detector. Also used in test equipment. Octal version of type 78. This type included a top-cap connection for the control grid. Later version, type 6SK7, had its control grid connection on pin 4.
- 6K8 and 12K8 – American Triode-Hexode mixer, 1938
- 6K11 – Compactron 2x High-mu + 1x medium-mu triple triode, 12-pin base
- 6L4 – Acorn UHF triode for use as an oscillator
- 6L5-G – Medium-mu triode (Similar to type 6J5-G, available only in ST shape)
- 6L6 (EL37) – High-powered beam tetrode.

There are several variations. Except for types 6L6-GC and 6L6-GX, all have the same maximum output ratings:

- 11.5 watts (single-ended Class-A circuit)
- 14.5 watts (push-pull Class-A circuit)
- 34 watts (push-pull Class-AB_{1} circuit)
- 60 watts (push-pull Class-AB_{2} circuit)

6L6 (metal envelope) and 6L6-G (shouldered glass envelope) were used in pre-World War II radios and Public Address amplifiers.
6L6 and 25L6 were introduced in 1935 as the first beam tetrodes. Both types were branded with the L6 ending to signify their (then) uniqueness among audio output tubes. However, this is the only similarity between the two tubes. (Type 6W6-GT is the 6.3 volt heater version of types 25L6-GT and 50L6-GT.)

- 6L6GA – Post-war version of type 6L6-G, in smaller ST-14 shape with Shouldered Tubular, (ST), shaped bulb, revision A.
- 6L6GB – Post-war improved version in a cylindrical glass envelope. Similar to type 5881.

- 6L6GTB – 6L6 with Tubular, (T), shaped bulb, revision B, (higher power rating, as it happens. The 6L6GTB can always replace the 6L6, 6L6G, and 6L6GT, but a 6L6GTB running at maximum rating should not be replaced with another subtype).
- 6L6-WGB – "Industrial" version of type 6L6GB.

- 6L6GC – Final and highest-powered audio version of the tube. Max. outputs:

- 17.5 watts (single-ended Class-A circuit)
- 32 watts (push-pull Class-A circuit)
- 55 watts (push-pull Class-AB_{1} circuit)
- 60 watts (push-pull Class-AB_{2} circuit)

- 6L6-GX – Class-C oscillator/amplifier used in transmitters. Max. output 30 watts. (All versions may be used as a Class-C oscillator/amplifier, but this version is specifically designed for this purpose, has a special ceramic base.)

- 6L7 – Pentagrid converter often used in console radios of the late 1930s. Similar in structure to pentode-triode pentagrid converters 6SA7 and 6BE6, except that a separate oscillator – usually type 6C5 – is required. Also, grid 1 is remote-cutoff control grid, grid 3 is oscillator input grid. (In types 6SA7 and 6BE6, grid 1 is the internal oscillator grid, grid 3 is the control grid.) Because of low conversion transconductance, radios using type 6L7 typically have either a tuned RF pre-amplifier stage, or at least two stages of I.F. amplification. (A few models have both.)
- 6M5 – Audio Output Pentode (Used as Class-A or C output stages of 1950s Australian radiograms) similar to 6BQ5
- 6M11 – Compactron Dual triode and pentode
- 6N3, EY82 – Half-Wave Rectifier
- 6N5 – Tuning indicator
- 6N7 – Dual Power Triode, used as Class-A audio driver or as Class-B power output (also 6N7-G and 6N7-GT). Max. output (Class-B) – 10 watts. Octal version of type 6A6.
- 6N8, EBF80 – Remote-cutoff pentode, dual diode. (detector plus RF or AF amplifier in radios)
- 6P5-G/GT – Medium-mu triode, Octal version of type 76, often used as driver for type 6AC5-G.
- 6P7-G – Rarely seen octal version of type 6F7.
- 6Q5-G – Triode gas thyratron used in DuMont oscilloscopes as a sweep generator. Identical to type 884.
- 6Q11 – Medium-mu triple triode, 12-pin base, for use as a sync clipper and gated AGC amplifier in TV receivers
- 6R3, EY81 – TV "Damper/Efficiency" Diode
- 6R7 – Dual Diode, Medium-mu Triode (also 6R7-G and 6R7-GT). Octal base with top cap. Miniature version – 6BF6. Amplification factor: 16.
- 6S7-G – Remote-cutoff RF Pentode, similar to type 6K7. Octal base with top cap. Has 150 mA heater. Used in pre-war 6-volt farm radios.
- 6S8-GT – Triple Diode, High-mu Triode. Octal tube with top-cap connection to triode grid. Has three identical diodes – two diodes share a cathode with the triode, one has a separate cathode. Used as a combined AM detector/AVC rectifier/FM ratio detector/A.F. amplifier in AM/FM radios. Typically, all sections of this tube are arranged around a single heater.
- 6T5 – "Magic Eye" Tuning indicator. Has incorporated driver triode with remote-cutoff grid. Has UX6 base. Shadow indicator is fully closed at zero signal. As signal increases, shadow grows outward from the center, covering the entire circumference of the indicator. Electronically identical to types 6G5 and 6U5, which may be used as substitutes.
- 6T7-G – Dual diode, high-mu triode, similar to type 6Q7. Octal base with top cap. Has 150 mA heater. Used in pre-war farm radios.
- 6T8 – Triple Diode, High-mu Triode. Has three identical diodes – two have cathodes connected to the triode's cathode, one has a separate cathode. Triode amplification factor: 70. Used as an AM detector/AVC rectifier/FM ratio detector/A.F. amplifier in North American AM/FM radios. Identical to type 6AK8/EABC80, but with a shorter glass envelope.
- 6U5 (UX6 base), 6U5G (Octal base) – "Magic Eye" Tuning indicator. Has incorporated driver triode with remote-cutoff grid. Has "pie wedge" shadow indicator that is open at zero signal and closes as signal increases. Electronically identical to types 6G5 and 6T5 and may be used as a substitute for those types. After World War II, most new 6U5s were double-branded as either 6G5/6U5 or 6U5/6G5.
- 6U7-G – Remote-cutoff R.F. Pentode. Most common commercial uses were as an I.F. amplifier or as a superheterodyne mixer, aka 1st detector. Also used in test equipment. Octal version of type 6D6. Most direct substitute: 6K7. Similar to types 58, 78 and 6SK7.
- 6U8A – Triode-pentode, Noval base. Audio preamplifier.
- 6U10 – 1x High-mu + 2x medium-mu triple triode, 12-pin base
- 6V4 (EZ80) – Noval-base, indirectly heated, full-wave rectifier. EZ80 rated at 90mA, but 6V4 only rated for 70. Some brands were identical.
- 6V6 – Beam power tetrode, used in single-ended Class-A audio output stages of radios and sometimes seen in Class-B audio amplifiers (see also: 5V6 and 12V6). Electrically similar to 6AQ5/EL90.

- 6V6G – 6V6 with Shouldered Tubular, (ST), shaped bulb.
- 6V6GT – 6V6 with Tubular, (T), shaped bulb.

- 6V7-G – Dual diode, Medium-mu Triode. Octal version of type 85. Amplification factor: 8.3. Similar to type 6R7.
- 6W6-GT – Beam power pentode, used most often as a Vertical Deflection Output tube in monochrome TV receivers of the 1950s. Can also be used as an Audio Output tube. This is the 6.3 volt heater version of types 25L6-GT and 50L6-GT.
- 6X4 (EZ90) and 6X5 (EZ35) – Full-wave rectifiers with indirectly heated common cathode. Type 6X4 has a 7-pin miniature base, the 6X5 has an octal base. Based on type 84/6Z4. No longer in production.
- 6AB4/EC92 – High-mu triode (Pinout same as 6C4 except for pin 5 not having a connection)
- 6AB5/6N5 – "Magic Eye" cathode ray tuning indicator
- 6AC5-G – High-mu Power Triode
- 6AC7, 1852 – TV sharp-cutoff R.F. Pentode. (Often encountered in a black metal envelope, not to be confused with the 6CA7.)
- 6AC10 – Compactron High-mu triple triode for use as NTSC chroma signal demodulator matrix in analog color TV receivers, 12-pin base
- 6AD6-G and 6AF6-G – "Magic Eye" tuning indicators. Both have two "pie wedge" shadow indicators, one each on opposite sides of a single circular indicator target. Both shadows may be used in tandem or may be driven by two different signal sources. Type 6AE6-G is specifically made to drive each indicator with different signals. May also be driven by separate pentodes with different characteristics. E.g., a sharp-cutoff pentode like a 6J7 – which would be hyper-sensitive to any signal change – would drive one shadow, while a remote-cutoff pentode like a 6K7 – which would only react to stronger signals – would drive the other shadow. Both tubes have octal bases. Type 6AD6-G, with a target voltage rated from 100 to 150 volt, is designed for AC/DC radios. Type 6AF6-G, with a target voltage rated at 250 volt, is designed for larger AC radios.
- 6AE6-G – A driver triode specially designed for "Magic Eye" tuning indicator types 6AD6-G and 6AF6-G. Has a common heater and indirectly heated cathode, two internally connected triode grids – one with sharp-cutoff characteristics, one with remote-cutoff characteristics – and two anodes, one for each grid. The sharp-cutoff grid reacts to any signal change, while the remote-cutoff grid reacts only to stronger signal changes.
- 6AE7-GT – Dual Triode with a common, single anode, for use as a power triode driver
- 6AF4 – UHF Medium-mu Triode, commonly found in TV UHF tuners and converters.
- 6AF11 – Compactron High-mu dual triode and sharp-cutoff pentode
- 6AG11 – Compactron High-mu dual triode and dual diode
- 6AH5-G – Beam power tube for early TV use. Same as type 6L6-G, but with scrambled pinout. Used in some Philco receivers.
- 6AK5, EF95, 5654, CV4010, 6J1P (6Ж1П) – Miniature V.H.F. Sharp-cutoff pentode (Used in old Radiosonde weather balloon transmitters, receiver front ends and contemporary audio equipment), Miniature 7-pin base
- 6AK6 – Power pentode. 7-pin miniature version of type 6G6-G. Unusual low-power consumption output tube with 150 mA heater.
- 6AK8/EABC80 – Triple Diode, High-mu Triode. Diodes have identical characteristics – two have cathodes connected to the triode's cathode, one has a separate cathode. Used as a combination AM detector/AVC rectifier/FM ratio detector/A.F. amplifier in AM/FM radios manufactured outside of North America. Triode amplification factor: 70. North American type 6T8 is identical (but for a shorter glass envelope) and may be used as a substitute.
- 6AK9 – Compactron 1x high-mu + 1x medium-mu dual triode and beam power pentode, 12-pin base
- 6AK10 – Compactron High-mu triple triode for use as NTSC chroma signal demodulator matrix in analog color TV receivers, 12-pin base
- 6AL3, EY88 – TV "Damper/Efficiency" Diode
- 6AL5, EAA91, D77 – Dual Diode, Detector. Often used in vacuum tube volt meters (VTVMs). Miniature version of type 6H6.
- 6AL6-G – Beam power tube for early TV use. Same as type 6L6-G, but with scrambled pinout and anode connected to top cap.
- 6AL7-GT – Tuning indicator used in many early AM/FM Hi-Fi radios. Similar in function to "Magic Eye" tubes. Has two bar-shaped shadows; one grows to indicate signal strength, the other moves to indicate center tuning on FM.
- 6AM6, EF91, Z77 – Sharp-cutoff R.F. pentode used in receiver front ends and test gear such as VTVMs and TV broadcast modulation monitors.
- 6AN7, – Triode-Hexode Oscillator/Mixer (radio)
- 6AN8, – Triode-Pentode used in frame timebase circuits for television. Electrically fairly similar to ECL80 but with a different pinout.
- 6AQ5 – Beam-power pentode, 7-pin miniature similar of type 6V6.
- 6AQ8/ECC85 – Dual triode with internal shield. Designed for use as oscillator and mixer in FM receivers. The heater to cathode insulation is inadequate for use in cascode operation
- 6AR8, 6JH8, 6ME8 – Beam deflection tubes for use as NTSC chroma signal demodulators in analog color TV receivers
- 6AS6 – Pentode with a fine-pitched suppressor grid which could serve as a second control grid. Used in radar phantastron circuits.
- 6AS7, 6080 – Dual low-mu Triode, low impedance, mostly used for voltage regulation circuits.
- 6AS11 – Compactron 1x high-mu + 1x medium-mu dual triode and sharp-cutoff pentode, 12-pin base
- 6AT6 – Dual Diode, High-mu Triode, miniature version of type 6Q7. Triode amplification factor: 70.
- 6AU4 – TV "Damper/Efficiency" Diode
- 6AU6, EF94, 6AU6A – Sharp-cutoff pentode
- 6AV6 – Dual Diode, High-mu Triode, miniature version of type 75. Triode amplification factor: 100. (Triode section similar in characteristics to one half of a 12AX7.)
- 6AV11 – Compactron Medium-mu triple triode, 12-pin base
- 6AX4 – TV "Damper/Efficiency" Diode
- 6AX5 – Full-wave rectifier. Octal base. Similar in structure to type 6X5, but with higher voltage and current ratings which are comparable to those of types 5Y3 and 80.
- 6BA6, EF93, W727, 5790 – Semiremote-cutoff R.F. Pentode (Often encountered in car radios)
- 6BD11 – Compactron 1x high-mu + 1x medium-mu dual triode and sharp-cutoff pentode, 12-pin base
- 6BE6, EK90, 5750, X727 – Pentagrid Converter (Often encountered in car radios)
- 6BF6 – Dual Diode, Medium-mu triode. Miniature version of octal type 6R7.
- 6BF8 – Sextuple diode with a common cathode
- 6BG6 – Beam tetrode, anode cap. Used in early TV magnetic-deflection horizontal-output stage.
- 6BH11 – Compactron Medium-mu dual triode and sharp-cutoff pentode
- 6BK4 – High Voltage beam Triode (30 kV anode voltage). Used as shunt regulator in color TV receivers and measurement equipment such as high voltage meters
- 6BK7 – Dual Triode with Internal shield between each section, used in RF circuits (Similar to 6BQ7)
- 6BK8, EF86, Z729 – Audio Pentode used in microphone preamplifiers and audiophile equipment
- 6BK11 – Compactron 2x High-mu + 1x medium-mu triple triode preamplifier, 12-pin base; used in some guitar amps made by Ampeg.
- 6BL6 (5836) – Sutton tube, a reflex klystron used as a 250 mW CW microwave source, 1.6 to 6.5 GHz depending upon an external cavity. 4-pin peewee base with cavity contact rings and top cap
- 6BL8, ECF80 – General-purpose Triode pentode used in TV, audio and test gear
- 6BM6 (5837) – Sutton tube used as a 150 mW CW microwave source, 550 MHz to 3.8 GHz depending upon an external cavity. 4-pin peewee base with cavity contact rings and top cap
- 6BM8, ECL82 – Triode pentode used as the driver and output stages in audio amplifiers, audio output and vertical output stages in TV receivers and has even been seen in an electronic nerve stimulator.
- 6BN6 – Gated-beam discriminator pentode, used in radar, dual channel oscilloscopes and F.M. quadrature detectors (cf. 6DT6, nonode).
- 6BQ5, EL84,(N709) – 5.7 Watts AF Power pentode, noval base
- 6BQ6-GT – Beam Power Pentode, used as a Horizontal Deflection Output tube in monochrome TV receivers of the 1950s. Most commonly used in receivers with diagonal screen sizes less than 19 inches (48 cm). (However, may be found in some larger models.) Larger receivers often used similar type 6DQ6. Later versions of this tube branded as 6BQ6-GTB/6CU6.
- 6BQ7 – Dual RF/VHF triode with internal screen. The two sections can be used independently or in a cascode stage

- 6BQ7A – Improved 6BQ7 capable of operation at UHF frequencies

- 6BU8 – Split Anode TV Sync Separator
- 6BX6, EF80 – Sharp-cutoff RF/IF/Video pentode, noval base
- 6BY6 – Similar to type 6CS6, but with higher transconductance. 3BY6 with a different heater
- 6BY7, EF85, W719 – Remote-cutoff R.F. Pentode (TV IF)
- 6BZ6 – Sharp-cutoff R.F. pentode used in video I.F. circuits of the 1960s.
- 6BZ7 – Dual Triode. See 6BK7
- 6CA4, EZ81 – Full Wave Rectifier
- 6CA7, EL34 – Audio Power Output Pentode
- 6CA11 – Compactron High-mu dual triode and sharp-cutoff pentode
- 6CB6 – Remote-cutoff R.F. Pentode used in video I.F. circuits of the 1950s and early 1960s.
- 6CG7 – Dual Triode (used in TV and some audio amplifiers including modern solid-state designs often as a cathode follower, similar to 6SN7)
- 6CJ6 – Line Output Pentode
- 6CL6 – Power pentode
- 6CM5, EL36, EL360 – Audio and TV Line Output Beam Power Tetrode.
- 6CS7 – Double Triode with dissimilar triodes. Used in televisions and tube amplifiers. 6CS7 Tube, Double Triode, Data Sheets | Bergholt.net
- 6CW4 – Nuvistor high-mu VHF triode, most common one in consumer electronics
- 6CZ5 – Beam pentode for use in vertical deflection or audio amplifier. In certain applications, it can be used in place of a 6973.
- 6DA6, EF89 – R.F. Pentode used in AM/FM radios manufactured outside North America.
- 6DJ8, ECC88, E88CC, 6922, 6N23P, 6N11 – Dual Audio and R.F. Triode (often used in TV broadcast equipment, test gear, oscilloscopes and audiophile gear) similar to 6ES8
- 6DQ6 – Beam Power Pentode, used as a Horizontal Deflection Output tube in monochrome TV receivers of the 1950s. Most often found in receivers with diagonal screen measurements larger than 17 inches (43 cm). Smaller receivers often used similar type 6BQ6-GT. Also used as Audio Output tubes in Standel guitar amplifiers. Later versions branded as 6DQ6-B/6GW6.
- 6DR8, EBF83 – R.F. pentode which will operate with 12 V anode supply, used as I.F. amplifier in car radios which run directly off the 13.5 volt supply.
- 6DS4 – Nuvistor VHF triode used in TV tuners immediately prior to the introduction of solid state tuning circuits. (RCA TVs equipped with a 6DS4 tuner bore the trademark "Nu-Vista Vision"); successor of the 6CW4.
- 6DS8, ECH83 – Triode-heptode Local oscillator-Mixer which will operate with 12 V anode supply, used in car radios which run directly off the 13.5 volt supply.
- 6DT6 – Quadrature detector used in TV audio circuits of the 1950s and early 1960s; cf. 6BN6, nonode.
- 6DV4 – Medium-mu Nuvistor triode for UHF oscillators; some versions had a gold-plated envelope
- 6DX8 – Triode pentode
- 6EM5 – TV Vertical Output Pentode
- 6ES6, EF98 – R.F. pentode which will operate with 12 V anode supply, used as tuned R.F. amplifier in car radios which run directly off the 13.5 volt supply.
- 6ES8, ECC89, E89CC – Dual Triode used as cascode R.F. amplifier in TV tuners and V.H.F. receiver front ends, also used as general-purpose dual triode in test gear, similar to 6DJ8
- 6EZ8 – High-mu triple triode, Noval base
- 6FH8 – Medium-mu triode and three-anode sharp-cutoff tetrode for use in TV receivers and complex wave generators
- 6GK5 – Miniature V.H.F. triode (Used as V.H.F. local oscillator in some T.V. Turret Tuners)
- 6GM5 – Beam power pentode, identical to 7591 and 7868 with a Noval base
- 6GV8, ECL85 – Triode Pentode (TV vertical output)
- 6GW8, ECL86 – Audio Triode Pentode (audio, TV vertical output)
- 6GY8 – High-mu triple triode for use as oscillator, mixer, RF amplifier or AFC tube, Noval base
- 6HS8 – Dual-anode pentode for TV receiver sync separation service or as a two-channel VCA
- 6JU8A – 9 mA, Quad diode, units 1&2 and 3&4 internally series-connected
- 6KM8 – Diode and three-anode sharp-cutoff tetrode for use in musical instruments, frequency dividers and complex wave generators
- 6LF6 – Beam power tetrode with a duodecar Compactron base and anode cap, for CRT horizontal-deflection amplifiers
- 6MD8 – Medium-mu triple triode for use as NTSC chroma signal demodulator matrix in analog color TV receivers, B9E Novar 9-pin base
- 6ME5 – "Magic Eye"-type tuning indicator, miniature 7-pin base
- 6MK8 – Dual-anode pentode for TV receiver sync separation service or as a two-channel VCA
- 6MJ8 – Medium-mu triple triode for use as NTSC chroma signal demodulator matrix in analog color TV receivers, 12-pin base
- 6MN8 – High-mu triple triode for use as NTSC chroma signal demodulator matrix in analog color TV receivers, 12-pin base
- 6SA7 – First pentode-triode style pentagrid converter. Octal type. Miniature version: 6BE6.
- 6SB7Y (octal), 6BA7 and 12BA7 (Noval) – VHF pentagrids, 1946
- 6SC7 – High-mu dual triode (Both sections share a single cathode)
- 6SK7 – Remote-cutoff pentode (Used in I.F. stages of North American radios) Miniature version: 6BD6
- 6SL7, ECC35 – Dual triode (Used in TV and general electronics)
- 6SN7, ECC32, B65, 13D2, CV1986, 6042 – Medium-mu dual triode (Used in Audio Amplifiers, Hammond Organs and Television; extensive use in World War II radar) Each section is equivalent to a 6J5. Miniature version: 12AU7
- 6SS7 – Remote-cutoff pentode (150 mA heater version of the 6SK7, found in some AA6 radios as both the RF amplifier and first IF). This is the only tube to have a same-letter repetition

=== "7" prefix Loctal tubes ===
These tubes all have 6.3 volt AC/DC heaters.

- 7A4 – Medium-mu triode, Loctal version of type 6J5, often numbered 7A4/XXL
- 7A5 – Beam power pentode, Loctal version of type 6U6GT
- 7A6 – Dual detector diode, similar to type 6H6
- 7A7 – Remote-cutoff pentode, Loctal version of type 6SK7
- 7A8 – The only octode pentagrid converter produced in America by Sylvania, 1939. Used mostly in Philco radios.
- 7B4 – High-mu triode, Loctal version of types 6F5 and 6SF5
- 7B5 – Power pentode, Loctal version of types 6K6 and 41
- 7B6 – High-mu triode, dual detector diodes, Loctal version of type 75, similar to types 6AV6 and 6SQ7
- 7B7 – Remote-cutoff pentode
- 7B8 – Pentagrid converter, Loctal version of types 6A7 and 6A8
- 7C4 – High frequency diode
- 7C5 – Beam power pentode, Loctal version of type 6V6
- 7C6 – High-mu triode, dual detector diode
- 7C7 – Sharp-cutoff pentode
- 7E5 – Medium-mu high-frequency triode
- 7E6 – Medium-mu triode, dual detector diode, Loctal version of types 6R7 and 6SR7, electronically identical to miniature type 6BF6.
- 7E7 – Semiremote-cutoff pentode, dual detector diode, similar to types 6B7 and 6B8
- 7F7 – High-mu dual triode, Loctal version of type 6SL7-GT
- 7F8 – Medium-mu VHF triode, used as amplifier or converter
- 7G7 – Sharp-cutoff pentode
- 7G8 – Sharp-cutoff dual tetrode
- 7H7 – Semiremote-cutoff pentode
- 7J7 – Triode-heptode converter, similar to type 6J8-G
- 7K7 – High-mu triode, dual detector diode, similar to types 6AT6 and 6Q7
- 7L7 – Sharp-cutoff pentode
- 7N7 – Dual medium-mu triode, Loctal version of type 6SN7-GT
- 7Q7 – Pentagrid converter, similar to type 6SA7
- 7R7 – Remote-cutoff pentode, dual detector diode
- 7S7 – Triode-heptode converter
- 7T7 – Sharp-cutoff pentode
- 7V7 – Sharp-cutoff pentode; 7W7 but with the suppressor grid on pin 4, an internal shield on pin 5, and the cathode on pin 7
- 7W7 – Sharp-cutoff pentode; 7V7 but with the suppressor grid and internal shield on pin 5, and the cathode on pins 4 and 7
  Note: When substituting a 7V7 for a 7W7 or vice versa, verify connections on socket pins 4 and 7; pin 5 is usually connected to the chassis
- 7X6 – Dual rectifier diode
- 7X7 – High-mu triode, dual detector diodes on separate cathodes, used as FM discriminator and AF amplifier, often numbered 7X7/XXFM
- 7Y4 – Full-wave rectifier
- 7Z4 – Full-wave rectifier
- 7AB7 – Sharp-cutoff pentode
- 7AD7 – Power pentode
- 7AF7 – Dual medium-mu triode
- 7AG7 – Sharp-cutoff pentode
- 7AH7 – Remote-cutoff pentode
- 7AJ7 – Sharp-cutoff pentode
- 7AK7 – Sharp-cutoff, dual control pentode for computer service. Perhaps the first active device specifically designed for computer use.

=== 12.6 volt heater tubes ===
- 12A5 – Power pentode. UX7 base. Center-tapped 12.6 V/300 mA resp. 6.3 V/600 mA heater. Mostly used in pre-war car radios.
- 12A7 – Power pentode, rectifier diode. Pentode section is similar to type 38. Diode has a low power rating – 120 volt, 30 mA – that limits the number of tubes that can be tied to its B+ circuit. Used in one-tube portable phonographs and a few two- and three-tube radios. Forerunner of such types as 32L7-GT, 70L7-GT and 117L7-GT. UX7 base with top cap. Not related to types 2A7 and 6A7.
- 12B4A – Low-mu triode, noval base.
- 12J5WGT – Heater cathode type, medium-mu triode, identical to 6J5WGT except heater characteristics
- 12K5 – Low-anode voltage tetrode with a space charge grid
- 12U5G – Tuning indicator identical to 6U5G except heater characteristics
- 12Z3 – Half-wave rectifier, UX4 base
- 12AB5 – Beam Power Tube
- 12AC10 – Compactron High-mu triple triode for use as NTSC chroma signal demodulator matrix in analog color TV receivers, 12-pin base
- 12AE10 – Compactron Beam power tube and sharp-cutoff pentode
- 12AL5 – Dual diode (similar to 6AL5 except for heater)
- 12AT6 – Dual diode/triode (Commonly replaced by 12AV6 in consumer radios)
- 12AT7, ECC81, 6060, B309, M8162 – High-mu dual triode. Commonly used as R.F. amplifier/mixer in VHF circuits.
- 12AU7, ECC82, 6067, B329, M8136 – Medium-mu dual triode. Two 6C4/EC90s in one envelope; however, it is only specified as an audio frequency device. Commonly used in audio applications and TV receivers.
- 12AV6 – Dual diode/High-mu triode (see also: 6AV6)
- 12AV7, 5965 – Medium-mu dual triode. Principally designed for VHF amplifier/mixer operation.
- 12AX7, ECC83, 6057, B327, M8137 – High-mu dual triode. Very similar to triode section of 6AV6. Commonly used in high-gain audio stages and as power inverters in class A/B amplifiers.
- 12AW7 – See 12DW7 below. Called AW by some, but proper name is DW.
- 12AY7 – Dual Triode. Medium gain but low noise, intended for low-level/preamplifier use.
- 12AZ7 – Dual Triode. Medium-mu, AF Amplifier, or combined oscillator and mixer, Noval base.
- 12BA6 – Remote-cutoff pentode, 6BA6/EF93 with a different heater
- 12BE6 – Pentagrid converter, 6BE6/EK90 with a different heater
- 12BH7 – Dual Triode, Medium-mu, designed for use in equipment having series heater-string arrangement.
- 12BY7 – Video Amplifier Pentode
- 12DT5 – Beam Power Pentode
- 12DT6 – Sharp-cutoff pentode
- 12DW7/ECC832, 7247 – Dissimilar triodes. One half 12AX7 value, other half 12AU7 value.
- 12EG6 – Pentagrid converter, both grids 1 and 3 are sharp-cutoff, has 12.6 volt anode and screen grid voltage, for use in car radios
- 12FA6 – Low-anode voltage, car radio version of 12BE6 pentagrid converter
- 12FQ8 – Common-cathode, dual split-anode triode for use in musical instruments, frequency dividers and complex wave generators
- 12FX8 – Low-anode voltage, triode-heptode converter for car radios
- 12GA6 – Similar to type 12FA6, but with lower conversion transconductance
- 12MD8 – Medium-mu triple triode for use as NTSC chroma signal demodulator matrix in analog color TV receivers, B9E Novar 9-pin base
- 12MN8 – High-mu triple triode for use as NTSC chroma signal demodulator matrix in analog color TV receivers, B12C Duodecar 12-pin base
- 12SA7 – Pentagrid converter (Octal version of 12BE6)
- 12SK7 – Remote-cutoff Pentode (Octal version of 12BA6)
- 12SQ7 – Dual diode, triode (Octal version of 12AV6)

=== "14" prefix Loctal tubes ===
These tubes all have 12.6 volt AC/DC heaters

- 14A4 – Medium-mu triode, Loctal version of type 12J5
- 14A5 – Beam power pentode
- 14A7 – Remote-cutoff pentode, often numbered 14A7/12B7
- 14B6 – High-mu triode, dual detector diode, similar to types 12AV6 and 12SQ7
- 14B8 – Pentagrid converter, Loctal version of type 12A8
- 14C5 – Beam power pentode, Loctal version of type 12V6-GT
- 14C7 – Sharp-cutoff pentode
- 14E6 – Medium-mu triode, dual detector diode, Loctal version of 12SR7
- 14E7 – Semiremote-cutoff pentode, dual detector diode, similar to type 12C8
- 14F7 – High-mu dual triode, Loctal version of type 12SL7-GT
- 14F8 – Medium-mu VHF triode, used as amplifier or converter
- 14H7 – Semiremote-cutoff pentode
- 14J7 – Triode-heptode converter
- 14N7 – Dual medium-mu triode, Loctal version of type 12SN7-GT
- 14Q7 – Pentagrid converter, similar to type 12SA7
- 14R7 – Remote-cutoff pentode, dual detector diode
- 14S7 – Triode-heptode converter
- 14W7 – Sharp-cutoff pentode
- 14X7 – High-mu triode, dual detector diodes on separate cathodes, used as FM discriminator and AF amplifier
- 14Y4 – Dual rectifier diode
- 14AF7 – Dual medium-mu triodes, often numbered 14AF7/XXD

=== 25 volt series heater tubes ===
- 25A6 – Power pentode, octal version of type 43
- 25C5 – Beam Power Pentode (Identical to the 50C5 but with a 25 V 300 mA heater)
- 25F5 – Beam Power Pentode (Identical to the 50C5, but with a 25 V 150 mA heater, used in some AA5 type radios using push-pull output)
- 25L6 – Beam-power pentode (Except for heater, electrically identical to type 50L6)
- 25Z5 – Dual rectifier diode
- 25Z6 – Octal version of 25Z5

=== 35 volt series heater tubes ===
- 35A5 – Beam Power Tube (Loctal, Similar to 35L6)
- 35B5 – Beam power tube
- 35C5 – Identical to 35B5 except for basing ("pin-out") arrangement (HL92)
- 35L6-GT – Beam power pentode similar to, but not electronically identical to, types 25L6-GT and 50L6-GT
- 35W4 – Rectifier diode
- 35Y4 – Rectifier Diode (Loctal, similar to 35Z5)
- 35Z3 – Rectifier Diode (Loctal, Similar to 35Z4)
- 35Z4-GT – Rectifier diode
- 35Z5-GT – Similar to 35Z4-GT, but equipped with a heater tap used to power a pilot light
- 35DZ8 – High-mu Triode/Beam Power tube (Like the 35HB8, used for audio)
- 35HB8 – Triode/Beam Power tube (Used primarily as both the audio amplifier and output)

=== 50 volt series heater tubes ===
- 50A5 – Beam Power Tube (Loctal, similar to 50L6)
- 50B5 – Beam power tube, similar to 35B5 but with 50 volt heater
- 50C5 – Similar to 35C5 but with 50 volt heater, and 50B5 except for basing ("pin-out") arrangement
- 50L6 – Beam power tube (see also 25L6)
- 50X6 – Dual Diode (Loctal, commonly used as a rectifier-doubler)
- 50DC4 – Rectifier diode (Similar to 35W4 except for heater)
- 50EH5 – Beam Power tube, (Similar to 50C5 but with higher gain, some radios that use this tube do not have an audio amplifier section.)
- 50HK6 – Power pentode (Filament is tapped for use with a dial lamp)

=== 117 volt heater tubes ===
All of the following tubes are designed to operate with their heaters connected directly to the 117 volt (now 120 volt) electrical mains of North America. All of them use indirectly heated cathodes. All of them incorporate at least one rectifier diode.

- Rectifier diode – Beam power pentode combinations

- 117L7GT
- 117M7GT
- 117N7GT
- 117P7GT

- Rectifier tubes

- 117Z3 – Single diode, 7-pin miniature version of 117Z4GT
- 117Z4GT
- 117Z6GT – Dual diode, can be used as a voltage doubler

=== Other tubes with nonstandard heater voltages ===
The tubes in this list are most commonly used in series-wired circuits.

- 5J6 – General purpose RF dual triode with common cathodes, a 6J6 with a 4.7 volt/600 mA controlled warm-up heater
- 8B10 – Compactron Dual triode and dual diode
- 2AF4 – UHF triode oscillator
- 2BN4 – VHF triode
- 2CW4 – Nuvistor high-mu VHF triode, 6CW4 with a 2.1 volt/450 mA heater; used in TV receivers with series heater strings
- 2CY5 – VHF sharp-cutoff tetrode
- 2EA5 – VHF sharp-cutoff tetrode
- 2EN5 – Dual diode
- 2ER5 – VHF triode
- 2ES5 – VHF triode
- 2EV5 – VHF sharp-cutoff tetrode
- 2FH5 – VHF triode
- 2FQ5 – VHF triode
- 2FV6 – VHF sharp-cutoff tetrode
- 2FY5 – VHF triode
- 4CB6 – Sharp-cutoff pentode
- 7AU7 – Medium-mu Dual triode with a center-tapped 7.0/3.5 V heater, like the 12AU7
- 7KY6 – Sharp-cutoff frame-grid pentode with a 7.3 volt nominal heater voltage for use as video output tube in TV receivers, Noval base
- 8AC10 – Compactron High-mu triple triode for use as NTSC chroma signal demodulator matrix in analog color TV receivers, 12-pin base
- 8FQ7/8CG7 – Dual triode (8 V version of the common 6CG7)
- 10DE7 – Dual triode (dissimilar triode sections)
- 11DS5 – Beam Power tube (11 V heater version of the 50B5/35B5)
- 13CW4 – Nuvistor used as a preamplifier in Neumann condenser microphones U-47 and U-48 after the production of the VF14 ceased
- 17EW8, HCC85 – Dual High-mu triode
- 18FX6 – Pentagrid converter (18 V version of the 12BE6)
- 18FY6 – Dual diode/triode (18 V version of the 12AV6)
- 34GD5 – Beam power tube (34 V version of the 35C5/50C5)
- 36AM3 – Half-wave rectifier (36 V version of the 35W4)
- 38HE7 – Compactron Diode and beam power tube
- 38HK7 – Compactron Diode and beam power tube

== List of RMA professional tubes ==
- 1B23 – 20 kW, 400 to 1500 MHz Gas-filled, cold-cathode Transmit/Receive Tube (TR cell)
- 1B41 – Gas-filled, cold-cathode 9.5 kV, 450 A spark gap
- 1B45 – Gas-filled, cold-cathode 14 kV, 450 A spark gap
- 1B49 – Gas-filled, cold-cathode 12 kV, 450 A spark gap
- 1C21 – Gas-filled, 25 mA_{avg}, 100 mA_{peak}, triode thyratron
- 1D21 – Strobotron Gas-filled, 50 mA_{avg}, 5 A_{peak}, luminescent tetrode thyratron for use as a stroboscope lamp
- 1P21 – 9-stage Photomultiplier, spectral S4 response, 11-pin base
- 1P25 – Infrared image converter used in World War II night vision "sniperscopes".
- 1P29 – Gas-filled phototube, spectral S3 response, 4-pin base
- 1P39 – Vacuum Phototube, spectral S4 response, 4-pin base
- 1S22 – 10 kV, 20 A Vacuum SPDT switch
- 2C21 – Dual triode, indirectly heated, 7-pin base plus a single top cap for one of the grids
- 2C22 – Transmitting triode, indirectly heated, Octal base plus dual top cap for grid and anode
- 2C36 – Rocket-type disk-seal UHF triode with an internal feedback circuit between cathode and anode, for use as UHF oscillator up to 1.75 GHz
- 2C37 – Rocket triode for use as SHF oscillator up to 3.3 GHz
- 2C39A – Oil can-type disk-seal UHF power triode with glass spacers up to 3 GHz, P_{anode} = 100 W

- 2C39B – 2C39A with ceramic spacers

- 2C40 – Lighthouse-type disk-seal UHF power triode for continuous operation, P_{anode} = 6.5 W at 3370 MHz
- 2C41 – Oil can UHF power triode for pulsed operation, 2200 W_{peak} at 3 GHz
- 2C42 – Lighthouse UHF power triode for pulsed operation, 1750 W_{peak} at 1050 MHz; improved 446
- 2C43 – Lighthouse UHF power triode, indirectly heated, up to 3.37 GHz, 6-pin Octal base
- 2C46 – Lighthouse UHF power triode
- 2C51 – Dual shielded triode, indirectly heated, 6-pin Octal base
- 2D21/EN91 (PL21, PL2D21, CV797) – 100 mA_{avg}, 500 mA_{peak}, 10 A_{surge}, Gas-filled, indirectly heated tetrode thyratron, negative starter voltage, miniature 7-pin base, for relay and grid-controlled rectifier service, used in jukeboxes and computer equipment.
- 2E22 – 53 W Power pentode, 5-pin base with anode on top cap
- 2E26 – Popular amateur 5.3 W VHF beam power tetrode up to 175 MHz, octal base
- 2E30 – 10 W Directly heated beam power tetrode with deflection screens available on separate pin, miniature 7-pin base
- 2E31 – Subminiature, directly heated, fully shielded sharp-cutoff RF/IF pentode, 5-pin all-glass wire-ended, FL
- 2E32 – Similar to 2E31, SL
- 2E35 – 6 mW Subminiature directly heated power pentode, 5-pin all-glass wire-ended, FL
- 2E36 – Similar to 2E35, SL
- 2E41 – Diode, pentode, FL
- 2E42 – Similar to 2E42, SL
- 2F21 – Indirectly heated hexode monoscope, Indian Head test pattern, 6-pin base with dual top caps for grid4 and anode
- 2G21 – Directly heated triode-heptode mixer, 7-pin all-glass wire-ended
- 2G41 – Triode-heptode converter, FL
- 2G42 – Similar to type 2G42, SL
- 2H21 – Phasitron, a magnetically controlled beam-deflection phase modulator tube similar to the 5593, used in early FM broadcast transmitters
- 2J30 to 2J34 – 300 kW S-band Magnetrons
- 2J55 and 2J56 – 40 kW X-band Magnetrons for use as pulsed oscillator
- 2K25 – 25 mW 8.5 to 9.66 GHz Reflex Klystron
- 2K50 – 15 mW 23.5 to 24.5 GHz Reflex Klystron
- 2P23 – Early image orthicon TV camera tube.
- 3B28 – Xenon half wave rectifier; ruggedized replacement for mercury vapor type 866.
- 3C22 – Disk-seal UHF power triode, P_{anode} = 125 W with forced-air cooling, 1.4 GHz
- 3C23 – 1.5 A_{avg}, 6 A_{peak}, Mercury-vapor triode thyratron, 4-pin base with anode top cap
- 3C45 – 45 mA_{avg}, 1.5 A_{RMS}, 35 A_{peak}, Half-indirectly heated hydrogen triode thyratron, 4-pin base with anode top cap
- 3D21 – Indirectly heated beam power tetrode, Octal base with anode top cap
- 3D22 – Gas-filled, 800 mA_{avg}, 8 A_{peak}, tetrode thyratron, 7-pin base
- 3E29 – Dual beam power tube used in radar equipment; a pulse rated variant of the earlier 829B, Septar 7-pin base with dual anode top cap.
- 4B32 – 10 kV, 1.25 A_{avg}, 5 A_{peak} Xenon half wave rectifier
- 4D21 (6155, Eimac 4-125A) – 125 W Glass VHF beam power tetrode
- 4E27 – 125 W Glass radial-beam power pentode
- 4J31 to 4J35 – 1 MW S-band Magnetrons
- 5B24 – Tungar bulb, a low-voltage, mercury-vapor, full wave rectifier for charging 60-cell lead-acid batteries at 6 A; 2.5 V, 24 A heater
- 5C22 – Half-indirectly heated, hydrogen triode thyratron for radar modulators.
- 5D22 (6156, Eimac 4-250A) – 250 W, 110 MHz Glass beam power tetrode
- 5J26 – 500 kW, 1.22 to 1.35 GHz S-band Magnetrons
- 6C21 – Triode radar modulator for "hard tube" pulsers.
- 7C23 – 120 kW Power triode for high voltage pulse operation.
- 8D21 – Internally water cooled dual tetrode used in early VHF TV transmitters.
- 9C21 – 100 kW Water-cooled power triode, directly heated, 4-pin base with dual top caps for grid and anode

== List of EIA professional tubes ==
Note: Most of these are special quality versions of the equivalents given. Some manufacturers preceded the EIA number with a manufacturer's code, as explained above.

=== 5000s ===
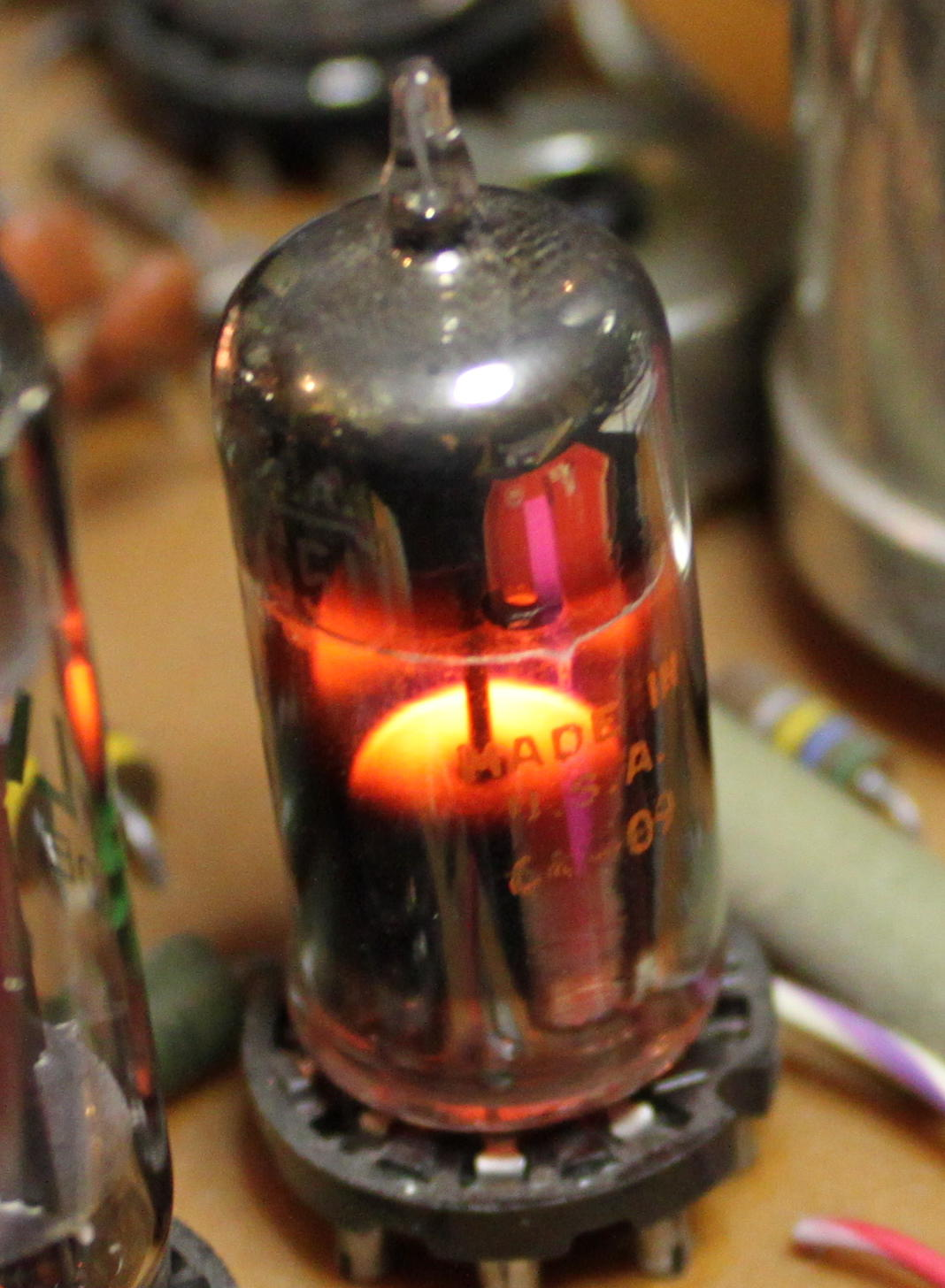
5651

- 5331, 5332, 5514 – Directly heated power triodes, 4-pin base with anode top cap
- 5556 – Directly heated power triode, 4-pin base
- 5593 – Phasitron, a magnetically controlled beam-deflection phase modulator tube similar to the 2H21, used in early FM broadcast transmitters
- 5608 – Dual power triode, designed for use with AC anode voltage and critical grid leak requirements
- 5651 – 86-volts, cold-cathode, glow-discharge voltage reference, 7-pin miniature base
- 5654, CV4010, 408A – VHF pentode; common in vintage radar IF amplifiers; premium version of 6AK5, EF95, 6J1P (6Ж1П)
- 5678 (CK5678 Raytheon) – 5 leads subminiature shielded pentode for RF applications
- 5691 – Special Red ruggedized long-life high-mu triode for industrial applications
- 5692 – Special Red ruggedized long-life medium-mu triode for industrial applications
- 5693 – Special Red ruggedized long-life sharp-cutoff pentode for industrial applications
- 5703 – Subminiature UHF triode, all-glass wire-ended
- 5704 – Subminiature diode, all-glass wire-ended
- 5727 – 650 V, 100 mA_{avg}, 500 mA_{peak}, 10 A_{surge} Indirectly heated tetrode thyratron, positive starter voltage, miniature 7-pin base
- 5729 – Beam-deflection, 30-channel analog multiplexer for telecomms transmitting channel banks, internal electrostatic focusing and deflection to determine through which one out of 30 grids the electron beam passes to the common anode. Cf. 5738, 6090, 6091, 6170, 6324
- 5731 – Narrow-tolerance selected 955 Acorn triode for use in Radiosonde weather balloon transmitters
- 5734 – Mechano-electronic displacement sensor; a vacuum triode with its anode mounted on a shaft that extends through a thin, flexible metal diaphragm; shaft movement is reflected in anode current; F_{res} = 12 kHz
- 5738 – Beam-deflection, secondary emission, 25-channel analog multiplexer, internal electrostatic focusing and deflection to determine which one out of 25 individually controllable dynodes receives the electron beam controlled by a common grid. Cf. 5729, 6090, 6091, 6170, 6324
- 5749– RF pentode; premium version of 6BA6, EF93, W727
- 5750 – Heptode mixer; premium version of 6BE6, EK90, X727
- 5751 – Low-noise avionics dual triode with separate cathodes
- 5814A – Industrial, computer-rated version of 12AU7/ECC82
- 5836, 6BL6
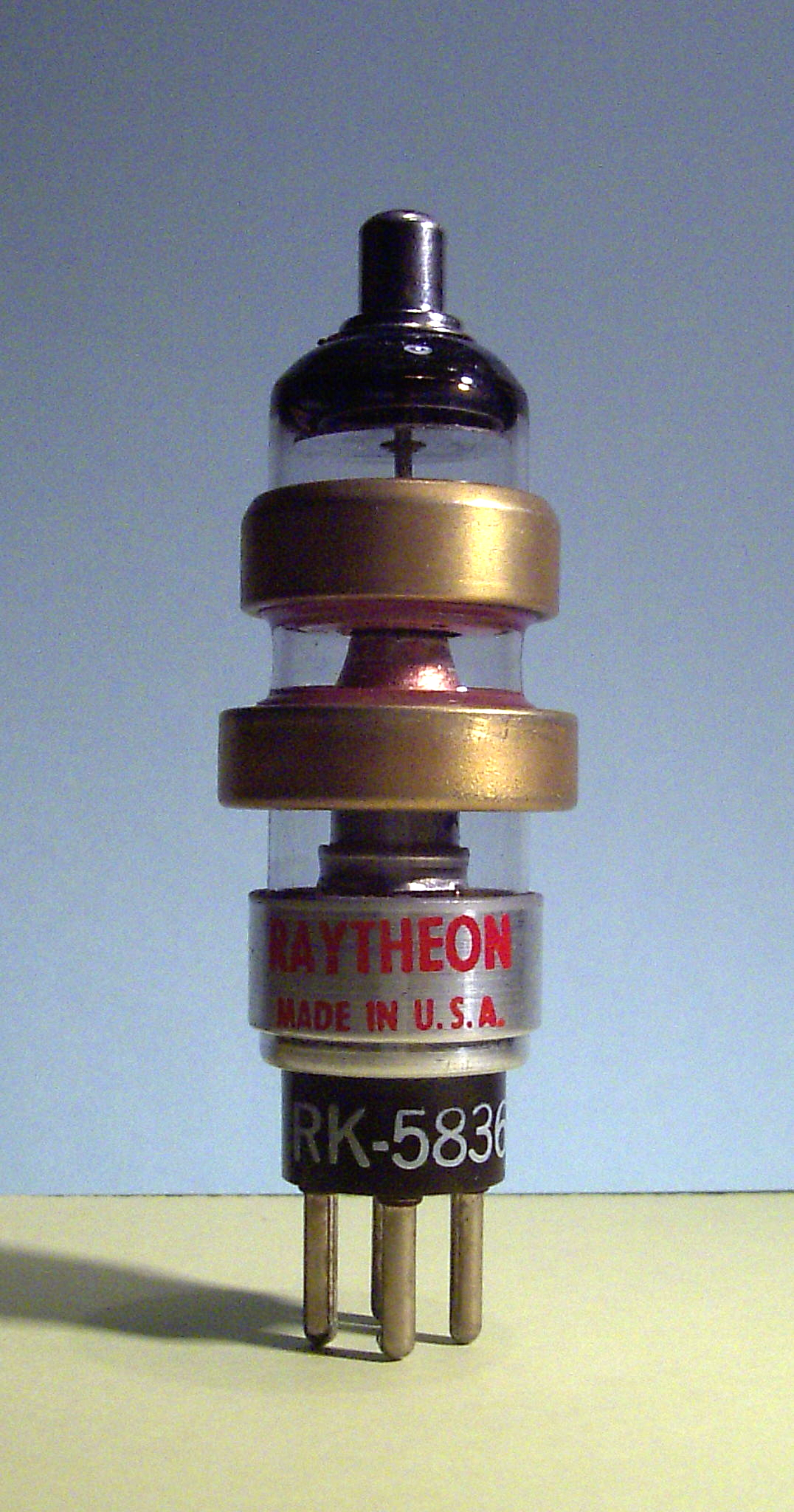
  Raytheon RK5836
  – Sutton tube, a reflex klystron used as a 250 mW CW microwave source, 1.6 to 6.5 GHz depending upon an external cavity. 4-pin peewee base with cavity contact rings and top cap
- 5837, 6BM6 – Sutton tube used as a 150 mW CW microwave source, 550 MHz to 3.8 GHz depending upon an external cavity. 4-pin peewee base with cavity contact rings and top cap
- 5840 – Subminiature sharp-cutoff RF pentode, all-glass wire-ended
- 5845 – Dual directly heated saturated-emission diode. Acts as a heating current-controlled, variable series resistor in voltage/current stabilizer circuits.
- 5876A – Glass pencil-type disk-seal UHF power triode up to 2 GHz
- 5899 – Subminiature semi-remote-cutoff pentode, low noise, all-glass wire-ended
- 5930 – Ruggedized, directly heated power triode, 4-pin base
- 5962 – 700 V/2...55 μA Corona voltage reference, miniature 7-pin base with anode top cap
- 5963, 5964, 5965 – Dual triode, designed for high speed digital computers, has a high zero-bias anode current, industrial/computer-rated versions of 12AV7
- 5998, 6336A, 6394, 6520, 6528, 7802 – Dual power triodes, designed for series voltage regulator applications

=== 6000s ===
- 6047 – Additron, a triple-control grid, split-anode tetrode for use as a single-bit digital full adder (technically a hexode)
- 6057, M8137 – High-mu dual triode; premium version of 12AX7, ECC83, B339
- 6059 – Low-microphonics pentode; premium version of 6BR7
- 6060, M8162 – High-mu dual triode; premium version of 12AT7, ECC81, B309
- 6064, M8083 – R.F. pentode; premium version of 6AM6, EF91, Z77
- 6067, M8136 – Medium-mu dual triode; premium version of 12AU7, ECC82, B329
- 6080 – Very-low impedance dual power triode, designed for series voltage regulator applications, now popular for output transformerless audio amplifiers; premium version of 6AS7
- 6082 – Ruggedized, indirectly heated power triode, octal base
- 6090 – Beam-deflection, 18-channel analog demultiplexer for telecomms receiving channel banks, internal electrostatic focusing and deflection to determine which one out of 18 anodes receives the electron beam controlled by a common grid. Cf. 5729, 5738, 6091, 6170, 6324
- 6091 – Beam-deflection, 25-channel analog multiplexer for telecomms transmitting channel banks, internal electrostatic focusing and deflection to determine through which one out of 25 grids the electron beam passes to the common anode. Cf. 5729, 5738, 6090, 6170, 6324
- 6146 – 60 MHz, 120 W AF/RF/VHF beam power pentode

- 6146B (8298A) – Improved version of 6146, 6146A and 8298.

- 6170 and 6324 – Beam-deflection, 25-channel analog multiplexer for telecomms transmitting channel banks, external focusing and deflection by a multiphase, rotating magnetic field to determine through which one out of 25 grids the electron beam passes to the common anode. Cf. 5729, 5738, 6090, 6091
- 6173 – Pencil-type disk-seal UHF diode up to 3.3 GHz
- 6196 – Directly heated dual, compensating electrometer tetrode with space charge grids for use in the 2 branches of a differential-in, differential-out bridge circuit
- 6218/E80T (CV5724) – Modulated, single-anode beam deflection tube for pulse generation up to 375 MHz; shock resistant up to 500 g
- 6263 – Pencil-type disk-seal UHF power triode up to 500 MHz, P_{anode} = 8 W
- 6351 – Secondary emission pentode for wide band RF amplifiers
- 6353 – 19.3 kV/25...1000 μA Corona voltage reference, miniature 7-pin base with anode top cap
- 6361 – Convectron, an inclinometer tube that senses tilt from the vertical by means of different gas convections around a heating wire in a glass envelope, of two 6361s aligned in a 90° V-shaped position to each other and the heating wires connected in a bridge circuit
- 6391 – Subminiature low-microphonics pentode, 8-pin all-glass wire-ended
- 6441 – 650 V, 100 mA_{avg}, 300 mA_{surge} Tacitron, a grid turn-off hydrogen thyratron with a grid that forms a shield around both the cathode and anode and separates the two by a wire mesh, so the arc discharge can be extinguished by a negative grid that surrounds the positive anode with a field of opposing polarity and inhibits conduction, taking over part of the anode current during deionisation – similar to today's GTOs; Octal base
- 6462 – Magnetic pickup tube, a 1-axis beam-deflection magnetometer with approx. 1 G (100 μT) resolution; an electron beam is electrostatically centered between two anodes while no magnetic field is present; the magnetic field to be detected will then deflect the beam more towards one of the anodes, resulting in an imbalance between the two anode currents
- 6550 – 20 W AF beam tetrode for high fidelity amplifiers

- 6550A – 6550 with a 42 watt anode

- 6571 – Williams-type computer memory tube
- 6577 – Typotron, a charactron for text mode video rendering in early computer monitors
- 6700 – 200 ns Decade counter Magnetron Beam Switching Tube, 6.3 V, 300 mA heater
- 6701 – Low-voltage 500 ns decade counter Magnetron Beam Switching Tube, 6.3 V, 300 mA heater
- 6703 – 500 ns Decade counter Magnetron Beam Switching Tube, 6.3 V, 300 mA heater
- 6704 – 100 ns Decade counter Magnetron Beam Switching Tube with internal spade load resistors, 6.3 V, 300 mA heater
- 6710, 6711, 6712 (High current), 6714 (Low voltage) – 2 MHz Decade counter Beam-X Switch, 6.3 V heater
- 6762 – Wamoscope, a TWT/CRT combination used to directly visualize an incoming microwave signal by electron velocity-sorting
- 6835, 7570, 7571 – Single-electron gun recording storage tube, an analog video frame freezer tube. This was achieved by a CRT that writes the video image onto a thin, dielectric target and subsequently can read the generated charge pattern up to 30000 times from that target, producing a video signal containing a static shot that resembles a still photograph
- 6846 – Gas-filled, three-cathode 1-bit binary counter or switching tube, Miniature 7-pin base
- 6877, 7233 – Power triodes, designed for series voltage regulator applications
- 6900 – Dual power triode for pulse applications in missiles, avionics and industrial systems; noval base
- 6922 (E88CC, industrial version of 6DJ8/ECC88)
- 6973 – Power pentode similar in shape, size, and base to the EL84/6BQ5, but with a high gain for more than double the output range. Popular in some makes of 1960s era guitar amplifiers, though rarely implemented in modern times.

=== 7000s ===
- 7025 – Low-hum, noise and microphonics version of 12AX7
- 7027 – AF Power pentode, improved 6L6 with a 25 Watt anode and different pinout

- 7027A – Improved 7027 with a 35 watt anode

- 7077 – Miniature ceramic/metal disk-seal UHF triode
- 7105 – 12.6-volts version of 6080
- 7189/6BQ5/EL84 – AF Beam power pentode

- 7189A – Improved 7189

- 7199 – Triode-pentode, noval base. Similar to 6U8.
- 7229, 7230, 7231, 7232, 7439, 7440, 7441, 7595, 7596, 7597, 7598, 7599, 7600, 7602 – Krytrons, cold-cathode gas-filled trigger tubes with a primer electrode for use as a very high-speed, high-surge current switch – second source to EG&G
- 7236 – Dual power triode for use as long-life power amplifier in computer applications
- 7241, 7242 – Triple-cathode power triodes, designed for hi-rel cathode follower series voltage regulator applications where the cathode is split into 3 sections connected together via balancing resistors to equalize the emission along the cathode
- 7266 – Miniature ceramic/metal disk-seal UHF diode
- 7289 – 3 GHz, 40 W UHF planar power triode
- 7308/E188CC – Premium version of 6922
- 7360 – Beam deflection tube, used as balanced modulator/mixer up to 100 MHz
- 7414 – Time Totalizer, a metal-vapor coulometer, a cold-cathode gas-discharge tube where metal is constantly sputtered off the cathode and deposited on a collector element whose resistance therefore decreases with elapsed time
- 7430 – Flat-envelope version of the 6AK5/EF95 sharp-cutoff pentode for use on PCBs in Radiosonde weather balloon transmitters
- 7548 – Secondary emission hexode for pulse generator and pulse amplifier applications
- 7551 – Noval-base beam power pentode with 12-15 volt heater. 6.3 volt heater version was 7558. Used in telephony, RF amplification, and more rarely AF amplification.
- 7554 – Ceramic/metal pencil-type disk-seal SHF power triode up to 5 GHz
- 7572, 7575, 7702 – Dual-electron gun recording storage tube, a realtime analog video frame freezer tube with simultaneous R/W, and storing capability. This was achieved by a CRT/camera tube combination; the CRT part writes the video signal onto a thin, dielectric target, which can hold the generated charge pattern for many hours; the camera part reads the charge pattern from the back side of this target, producing a video signal containing a static shot that resembles a still photograph
- 7586 – First Nuvistor available on the market, medium-mu triode
- 7587 – Nuvistor Sharp cutoff tetrode
- 7591 – Beam power pentode, octal base. Found in many guitar amps made by Gibson and Ampeg.
- 7688, 7690 (Medium-mu), 7689 (high-mu) – triple triodes
- 7699 – Dual tetrode for wide band push-pull amplifiers
- 7762 – Shock-proof avionics AF beam power pentode
- 7763 – Beam deflection tube, used as IF amplifier/limiter where a constant phase shift over a wide range of input signal amplitudes is required
- 7768 – Miniature ceramic/metal disk-seal planar SHF triode up to 4 GHz
- 7868 – Beam power pentode, B9E Novar base version of 7591. Found in many of the once popular Challenger series PA amps made by Bogen Communications, also found in some guitar amplifiers made by Ampeg.
- 7895 – Improved 7586 Nuvistor with higher mu

=== 8000s ===
- 8011 – Micropup-type UHF power triode up to 600 MHz
- 8056 – Nuvistor triode for low supply voltage
- 8058 – Nuvistor triode with grid on envelope and an anode cap, for grounded-grid UHF circuits
- 8069 – 8 kV/23...1000 μA Corona voltage reference, cathode cylinder and anode top cap
- 8089 – 1.6 kV/20...800 μA Corona voltage reference, 2-pin all-glass wire-ended
- 8090 – 3.5 kV/50...1000 μA Corona voltage reference, Noval base with anode top cap
- 8091 – 4 kV/50...1000 μA Corona voltage reference, Noval base with anode top cap
- 8122 – Forced-air cooled, 300 W@470 MHz beam power tetrode
- 8254 – Subminiature triode, low Cg for instrumentation, all-glass wire-ended
- 8256 – 3.5 kV/35...1900 μA Corona voltage reference, 2-pin all-glass wire-ended
- 8257 – 1.2 kV/15...750 μA Corona voltage reference, 2-pin all-glass wire-ended
- 8393 – Nuvistor Medium-mu triode, used in Tektronix oscilloscopes, 13.5 Volt heater
- 8469 – 400 V/5...400 μA Corona voltage reference, 2-pin all-glass wire-ended
- 8506 – Miniature ceramic/metal disk-seal planar UHF triode
- 8514 – 1 kV/10...800 μA Corona voltage reference, 7-pin with anode top cap
- 8515 – 1.6 kV/20...950 μA Corona voltage reference, 7-pin with anode top cap
- 8526 – Nuvistor-type medium-mu dual triode
- 8873 – 500 MHz, 200 W anode dissipation power triode
- 8874 – 500 MHz, 400 W anode dissipation power triode
- 8875 – 500 MHz, 300 W anode dissipation power triode
- 8877 = 3CX1500A7 – Ceramic, forced air cooled, 1.5 kW power triode
- 8974 (X-2159) – Giant water-cooled megawatt-class tetrode used for very high-power broadcast and industrial service; possibly the most powerful tube ever commercially produced

== List of Pro Electron professional tubes ==
Note: Typecode explained above.

=== X - Electro-optical devices ===
==== XA ====
- XA1003 – Phototube, caesium-on-oxydated-silver cathode, 2-pin all-glass wire-ended

==== XG ====
- XG2000 – Image converter for x-ray diagnostics

==== XL ====
- XL7900 – Vibrating-capacitor chopper front end for dosimeters, electrometers, pH meters etc., Magnoval base with gold-plated pins

==== XM ====
- XM1000 – Nimo tube, directly heated cathode-ray 1-digit numeric display tube, decimal points on both sides, hence 12 stenciled electron guns, top-viewing, green, 15 mm high Futura Medium font, oval envelope for easy horizontal stacking, 14-pin base

==== XP ====
- XP1000 – 10-stage photomultiplier, blue-sensitive Sb-Cs cathode, Ag-Mg-O-Cs dynodes, diheptal (14-pin) base
- XP1001 – 10-stage photomultiplier for gamma ray scintillation spectrometry, Sb-Cs cathode, Ag-Mg-O-Cs dynodes
- XP1002 – 10-stage photomultiplier, blue/green/yellow/orange-sensitive Sb-Na-K-Cs cathode, Ag-Mg-O-Cs dynodes, diheptal base
- XP1003 – 10-stage photomultiplier with quartz window, UV/blue/green/yellow/orange-sensitive Sb-Na-K-Cs cathode, Ag-Mg-O-Cs dynodes, diheptal base
- XP1004 – 10-stage photomultiplier with quartz window, UV/blue-sensitive Sb-Cs cathode, Ag-Mg-O-Cs dynodes, diheptal base
- XP1005 – 10-stage Ag-O-Cs (800±100 nm) photomultiplier, IR/red-sensitive Ag-O-Cs cathode, Ag-Mg-O-Cs dynodes, diheptal base
- XP1010 – 10-stage photomultiplier for r-ray and gamma ray scintillation spectrometry, selected 150AVP for low noise and resolution, blue-sensitive Sb-Cs cathode, Ag-Mg-O-Cs dynodes, duodecal (12-pin) base
- XP1011 – 10-stage photomultiplier, blue-sensitive Sb-Cs cathode, Ag-Mg-O-Cs dynodes, shock and vibration-proof, duodecal base
- XP1020 – 12-stage photomultiplier, blue-sensitive Sb-Cs cathode, Ag-Mg-O-Cs dynodes, 100 Ω output, duodecal (20-pin) base
- XP1021 – 12-stage photomultiplier, UV/blue-sensitive Sb-Cs cathode, Ag-Mg-O-Cs dynodes, 50 Ω output, duodecal base
- XP1023 – 12-stage photomultiplier with quartz window Sb-Cs cathode, Ag-Mg-O-Cs dynodes, UV/blue-sensitive, 50 Ω output, duodecal base
- XP1030 – 10-stage photomultiplier, blue-sensitive Sb-Cs cathode, Ag-Mg-O-Cs dynodes, diheptal (14-pin) base
- XP1031 – 10-stage photomultiplier, blue-sensitive Sb-Cs cathode, Ag-Mg-O-Cs dynodes, for gamma ray scintillation spectrometry
- XP1032 – 10-stage photomultiplier with 3 mm quartz window, UV/blue-sensitive Sb-Cs cathode, Ag-Mg-O-Cs dynodes, diheptal base
- XP1033 – 10-stage photomultiplier with 10 mm quartz window, UV/blue-sensitive Sb-Cs cathode, Ag-Mg-O-Cs dynodes, diheptal base
- XP1040 – 14-stage photomultiplier, blue-sensitive Sb-Cs cathode, Ag-Mg-O-Cs dynodes, concave window, duodecal base
- XP1110 – Photomultiplier, blue-sensitive Sb-Cs cathode, Ag-Mg-O-Cs dynodes
- XP1111 – Photomultiplier, blue-sensitive Sb-Cs cathode, Ag-Mg-O-Cs dynodes, wire-ends
- XP1113 – 6-stage Photomultiplier, blue-sensitive Sb-Cs cathode, Ag-Mg-O-Cs dynodes
- XP1114 – 4-stage Photomultiplier, blue-sensitive Sb-Cs cathode, Ag-Mg-O-Cs dynodes
- XP1115 – Photomultiplier, blue-sensitive Sb-Cs cathode, Ag-Mg-O-Cs dynodes, wire-ends, shock and vibration-proof
- XP1116 – Photomultiplier, red-sensitive Ag-O-Cs cathode, Ag-Mg-O-Cs dynodes, shock and vibration-proof
- XP1117 – 9-stage photomultiplier, blue/green/yellow/orange-sensitive Sb-Na-K-Cs cathode, Ag-Mg-O-Cs dynodes
- XP1118 – Photomultiplier with quartz window, UV/blue-sensitive Sb-Cs cathode, Ag-Mg-O-Cs dynodes
- XP1120 – 17-stage photomultiplier for x-ray (λ > 200 pm) or UV (λ < 150 nm) photon counting in a high-vacuum environment, Nickel cathode, Cu-Be-O dynodes, coaxial outputs, built-in resistor ladder
- XP1121 – 17-stage photomultiplier for ion (> 10 keV) or electron (0.1...10 keV) photon counting in a high-vacuum environment, Cu-Be-O cathode and dynodes, coaxial outputs, built-in resistor ladder
- XP1122 – 17-stage photomultiplier for x-ray (λ > 200 pm) or UV (λ < 150 nm) photon counting in a high-vacuum environment, Nickel cathode, Cu-Be-O dynodes, coaxial outputs, built-in resistor ladder
- XP1123 – 17-stage photomultiplier for ion (> 10 keV) or electron (0.1...10 keV) photon counting in a high-vacuum environment, Cu-Be-O cathode and dynodes, coaxial outputs, built-in resistor ladder
- XP1130 – 17-stage photomultiplier for x-ray (λ > 200 pm) or UV (λ < 150 nm) photon counting in a high-vacuum environment, Nickel cathode, Cu-Be-O dynodes, coaxial outputs, built-in resistor ladder
- XP1131 – 17-stage photomultiplier for ion (> 10 keV) or electron (0.1...10 keV) photon counting in a high-vacuum environment, Cu-Be-O cathode and dynodes, coaxial outputs, built-in resistor ladder
- XP1140 – 6-stage photomultiplier, blue-sensitive Sb-Cs cathode, Ag-Mg-O-Cs dynodes, fast, diheptal base
- XP1141 – 7-stage photomultiplier, blue-sensitive Sb-Cs cathode, Ag-Mg-O-Cs dynodes, fast, diheptal base
- XP1180/52AVP – 10-stage photomultiplier, blue-sensitive Sb-Cs cathode, Ag-Mg-O-Cs dynodes, fast, diheptal base
- XP1240 – Photomultiplier

==== XQ ====
- XQ1023 – Camera tube
- XQ1029R – Camera tube, red channel
- XQ1032 – 1" Vidicon; magnetic focusing and deflection
- XQ1053 – Camera tube
- XQ1072 – 1" Plumbicon
- XQ1073 – XQ1072 with higher resolution and improved low level contrast
- XQ1200 – Vidicon, silicon target
- XQ1270 – 2/3" Vidicon; Overall length 108mm (4 1/4")
- XQ1272 – 2/3" Vidicon
- XQ1274 – 2/3" Newvicon, magnetic focussing and deflection, ZnSe+CdZnTe target
- XQ1275 – Vidicon, silicon target
- XQ1276 – XQ1274 with high sensitivity into the near infrared
- XQ1277 – XQ1275 with high sensitivity into the near infrared
- XQ1278 – XQ1275 with better geometry and uniform signal
- XQ1285 – 1" Vidicon; magnetic focusing and deflection, precision electron gun
- XQ1290 – 1" Resistron camera tube
- XQ1293 – Camera tube
- XQ1300 – Saticon Camera Tube
- XQ1340 – Low-light Vidicon
- XQ1371 – Resistron
- XQ1380 – XQ1274 with radiation resistant (anti-browning) faceplate
- XQ1381 – 2/3" Newvicon; electrostatioc focusing and magnetic deflection with radiation-resistant (anti-browning) faceplate
- XQ1395 – High-resolution Resistron camera tube
- XQ1410B/G/R – Plumbicon for color TV broadcast
- XQ1412 – 6/5" Plumbicon; low lag, unity gamma matched to P20 phosphor
- XQ1413B/G/R – Plumbicon for color TV broadcast
- XQ1415B/G/R – Plumbicon for color TV broadcast
- XQ1427 – 2/3" Plumbicon; low lag
- XQ1427B/G/R – Plumbicon for color TV broadcast
- XQ1430B/G/R – Plumbicon for color TV broadcast
- XQ1435B/G/R – Plumbicon for color TV broadcast
- XQ1440 – 1" Newvicon, separate mesh, ZnSe+CdZnTe target
- XQ1500B/G/R – Plumbicon for color TV broadcast
- XQ1505B/G/R – Plumbicon for color TV broadcast
- XQ1560 – 1" Saticon
- XQ1565 – 1" Saticon
- XQ1570 – 1" Saticon
- XQ1575 – 1" Saticon
- XQ1585 – 1" Saticon
- XQ1600 – 1/2" Vidicon; separate mesh, electrostatic focusing and magnetic deflection
- XQ1601 – 1/2" Newvicon; separate mesh, electrostatic focusing and magnetic deflection
- XQ2070/02B/G/R – Plumbicon for color TV broadcast
- XQ2070/05B/G/R – Plumbicon for color TV broadcast
- XQ2075/02B/G/R – Plumbicon for color TV broadcast
- XQ2075/05B/G/R – Plumbicon for color TV broadcast
- XQ2172 – 1" Plumbicon; wide dynamic range matched to digital radiography applications
- XQ2182 – 1" Plumbicon; wide dynamic range matched to digital radiography applications
- XQ2427B/G/R – Plumbicon for color TV broadcast
- XQ3070/02B/G/R – Plumbicon for color TV broadcast
- XQ3070/05B/G/R – Plumbicon for color TV broadcast
- XQ3075/02B/G/R – Plumbicon for color TV broadcast
- XQ3075/05B/G/R – Plumbicon for color TV broadcast
- XQ3427B/G/R – Plumbicon for color TV broadcast
- XQ3430B/G/R – Plumbicon for color TV broadcast
- XQ3435B/G/R – Plumbicon for color TV broadcast
- XQ3440B/G/R – Plumbicon for color TV broadcast
- XQ3445B/G/R – Plumbicon for color TV broadcast
- XQ3457B/G/R – Plumbicon for color TV broadcast
- XQ3467B/G/R – Plumbicon for color TV broadcast
- XQ3477B/G/R – Plumbicon for color TV broadcast
- XQ3487B/G/R – Plumbicon for color TV broadcast
- XQ3550B/G/R – Plumbicon for color TV broadcast
- XQ3555B/G/R – Plumbicon for color TV broadcast
- XQ4187B/G/R – Plumbicon for color TV broadcast
- XQ4502 – 2" Plumbicon; Highest resolution, low lag
- XQ5002 – 2" Plumbicon; Electrostsatic deflection for improved corner resolution, low output capacitance
- XQ7002 – 1" Plumbicon; Low output capacitance
- XQ8002 – 1" Plumbicon
- XQ9002 – 1" Plumbicon

==== XR ====
- XR1000 – Monoscope, test pattern specified by suffix

==== XX ====
- XX1000 – 2-stage image intensifier
- XX1010 – Image intensifier
- XX1020 – Image intensifier
- XX1030 – Image intensifier
- XX1050 – Image intensifier
- XX1060 – Image intensifier
- XX1066 – 1. Gen. 3-stage image intensifier
- XX1140 – 1. Gen. 3-stage image intensifier
- XX1190 – 1. Gen. inverter, 1-stage image intensifier
- XX1192 – 1. Gen. inverter, 1-stage image intensifier
- XX1200 – 1. Gen. inverter, 1-stage image intensifier
- XX1211 – 1. Gen. inverter, 3-stage image intensifier
- XX1270 – 1. Gen. inverter, 2-stage image intensifier
- XX1400 – 2. Gen. inverter, 1-stage image intensifier
- XX1430 – 1. Gen. inverter, 1-stage image intensifier
- XX1510 – 1. Gen. 3-stage image intensifier
- XX1610 – 2. Gen. image intensifier
- XX1800 – 2. Gen. proximity focused, 1-stage image intensifier

=== Y - Vacuum tubes ===
==== YA ====
- YA1000 – 5 kV, 5mA, Directly heated saturated-emission diode with pure-metal cathode for use in RMS converters of AC voltage/current stabilizer circuits, noval base

==== YD ====
- YD1000 – 45 kW, Water-cooled RF power triode
- YD1001 – 35 kW, Air-cooled RF power triode
- YD1012 – 180 kW, Vapor-cooled RF power triode
- YD1130 – 400 W, Air-cooled, linear RF/AF power triode
- YD1252 (RS 2051 V) – 180 kW, Water-cooled, modulator power triode
- YD1300 – 300 W, Air-cooled, UHF power triode
- YD1301 – 300 W, Air-cooled, UHF power triode
- YD1302 – 300 W, Air-cooled, UHF power triode
- YD1332 – 1.8 kW, Air-cooled, UHF power triode
- YD1333 – 900 W, Air-cooled, UHF power triode
- YD1334 – 1.8 kW, Air-cooled, UHF power triode
- YD1335 – 1.9 kW, Air-cooled, UHF power triode
- YD1336 – 1.8 kW, Air-cooled, UHF power triode
- YD1342 – 30 MHz, 240 kW, Water-cooled RF power triode
- YD1352S (8867, DX334) – 5 MHz, 2 kW, Water-cooled Neotron, a gridless field-effect tube where a magnetically focused electron beam is modulated by varying the voltage of a gate electrode surrounding it. Used as RF power amplifier or oscillator

==== YG ====
- YG1000 – Directly heated electrometer tetrode with an oxide cathode and a space charge grid, grid current ≤600 fA, magnoval base with input grid on top cap

==== YH ====
- YH1000 – Traveling-wave tube
- YH1050 – Traveling-wave tube
- YH1110 – Traveling-wave tube
- YH1120 – Traveling-wave tube, >5 GHz
- YH1131 – Traveling-wave tube, >11 GHz
- YH1150 – Traveling-wave tube
- YH1160 – Traveling-wave tube, >3 GHz
- YH1181 – Traveling-wave tube, >4 GHz
- YH1190 – Traveling-wave tube, >11 GHz
- YH1200 – Traveling-wave tube, >5 GHz

==== YJ ====
- YJ1000 – Indirectly heated, 2.5 kW magnetron for use as a pulsed X-band oscillator between 9.19 and 9.32 GHz
- YJ1462 – Indirectly heated, 28 kW coaxial magnetron for use as a pulsed X-band oscillator at 9.375 GHz

==== YK ====
- YK1000 – Water-cooled, permanent-magnet 11 kW UHF linear-beam Klystron for use in TV transmitters between 400 and 620 MHz
- YK1004 – Water-cooled, permanent-magnet 11 kW UHF linear-beam Klystron for use in TV transmitters between 610 and 790 MHz
- YK1005 – Water-cooled, permanent-magnet 11 kW UHF linear-beam Klystron for use in TV transmitters between 470 and 860 MHz
- YK1046 – 35 mW X-band Reflex Klystron, 9.16 to 9.34 GHz
- YK1151 – Forced-air cooled, permanent-magnet 25 kW UHF linear-beam Klystron for use in TV transmitters between 470 and 860 MHz
- YK1190 – Water-cooled 40 kW UHF linear-beam Klystron for use in TV transmitters between 470 and 610 MHz
- YK1191 – Water-cooled 40 kW UHF linear-beam Klystron for use in TV transmitters between 590 and 720 MHz
- YK1192 – Water-cooled 40 kW UHF linear-beam Klystron for use in TV transmitters between 710 and 860 MHz

==== YL ====
- YL1000/8463 – RF power pentode
- YL1020/8118 – See QQZ03/20
- YL1030 – See QQZ06/40
- YL1050 – UHF power tetrode
- YL1060/7854 – See QQE06/40
- YL1070/8117 – Dual RF power tetrode
- YL1071 – YL1070 with a different heater
- YL1080/8348 – Dual VHF power tetrode
- YL1120 – RF power tetrode
- YL1130/8408 – Dual VHF power pentode
- YL1150/8579 – RF beam power tetrode
- YL1190/8580 – Dual UHF power tetrode
- YL1200 – See PE1/100
- YL1210 – QQE03/12 with a different heater
- YL1220 – QQE02/5 with a different heater
- YL1240/8458 – Dual VHF power tetrode
- YL1250/8505 – VHF beam power tetrode
- YL1270/8581 – Dual UHF power tetrode
- YL1290 – QE08/200 with a different heater
- YL1310/8603 – RF beam power tetrode
- YL1360 – QQE04/5 with a different heater
- YL1570 (RS 1084 CJ) – VHF power tetrode

=== Z - Gas-filled tubes ===
Note: See also standard M-P tubes under Z

==== ZA ====
- ZA1000 – Neon-filled, coaxial, tritium-primed (half-life: 12.32 years), sputtered-molybdenum cold-cathode switching diode, meshed cylinder anode, all-glass wire-ended
- ZA1001 – Neon-filled, coaxial, tritium-primed, sputtered-molybdenum cold-cathode switching diode with traces of heavy gas (krypton/xenon) for slow de-ionization, e.g. for low-frequency relaxation oscillators; meshed cylinder anode, all-glass wire-ended
- ZA1002 – Neon-filled, coaxial, tritium-primed, sputtered-molybdenum cold-cathode switching diode, large difference between burning and ignition voltage, meshed cylinder anode, 3-pin all-glass wire-ended
- ZA1003 – Neon-filled, coaxial, tritium-primed, sputtered-molybdenum cold-cathode switching diode for use as indicator tube in transistorized circuits, meshed cylinder anode, 3-pin all-glass wire-ended
- ZA1004 – Neon-filled, coaxial, tritium-primed, sputtered-molybdenum cold-cathode switching diode, small difference between burning and ignition voltage, for use as indicator tube in transistorized circuits or as 86.4 V Voltage reference, meshed cylinder anode, 3-pin all-glass wire-ended
- ZA1005 – Neon-filled, coaxial, tritium-primed, sputtered-molybdenum cold-cathode switching diode for use like a DIAC in thyristor circuits, meshed cylinder anode, 2-pin all-glass wire-ended

==== ZC ====
- ZC1010 (Z661W) – 8 mA_{avg}, 50 mA_{peak}, Gas-filled, cold-cathode AC trigger pentode, two starters and a primer electrode, positive starter voltage, 5-pin all-glass wire-ended, envelope inside radioactively coated for a constant ignition voltage, for use in bidirectional counters
- ZC1040 – 25 mA, Gas-filled, cold-cathode AC trigger tetrode, one starter and a primer electrode, positive starter voltage, noval base
- ZC1050 – 2 mA, Gas-filled, cold-cathode, luminescent trigger tetrode, one starter and a primer, 300 mlm light output for use as self-displaying shift register cells in large-format, crawling-text dot-matrix displays; all-glass wire-ended
- ZC1060 – 20 mA_{avg}, 5 kA_{peak}, Gas-filled, cold-cathode, high-current trigger triode for e.g. capacitor discharge circuits. One external (capacitive) starter electrode

==== ZM ====
- ZM1000 – 0 1 2 3 4 5 6 7 8 9 Neon-filled digital indicator tube, 14 mm character height side-viewing, left decimal point
- ZM1000R – ZM1000 with a red contrast filter coating
- ZM1001 – + - ~ X Y Z Neon-filled digital indicator tube, 14mmCH side-viewing, for use with ZM1000
- ZM1001R – ZM1001 with a red contrast filter coating, for use with ZM1000R
- ZM1002 – ns μs ms s Hz kHz MHz Neon-filled digital indicator tube, 13mmCH side viewing, for use with ZM1000 in digital frequency counters
- ZM1003 – 1 - + Neon-filled digital indicator tube, 14mmCH side-viewing, for use with ZM1000
- ZM1005 – 0 1 2 3 4 5 6 7 8 9 Long-life neon-filled digital indicator tube, 14mmCH side-viewing, left decimal point, multiplex-capable
- ZM1005R – ZM1005 with a red contrast filter coating
- ZM1006 – 1 2 3 4 5 6 Neon-filled digital indicator tube, side-viewing, left and right decimal point, for use in TV receivers
- ZM1008 – 0 1 2 3 4 5 6 7 8 9 Neon-filled digital indicator tube, 14mmCH side-viewing
- ZM1010 – 0 1 2 3 4 5 6 7 8 9 Neon-filled digital indicator tube, 14mmCH side-viewing, left decimal point
- ZM1012 – 0 1 2 3 4 5 6 7 8 Neon-filled digital indicator tube, 14mmCH side-viewing
- ZM1015 – 0 1 2 3 4 5 6 7 8 Neon-filled digital indicator tube, 14mmCH side-viewing
- ZM1020 (Z520M) – ZM1022 with a red contrast filter coating
- ZM1021 (Z521M) – ZM1023 with a red contrast filter coating, for use with ZM1020
- ZM1022 – 0 1 2 3 4 5 6 7 8 9 Neon-filled digital indicator tube, 15.5mmCH top-viewing, no decimal point
- ZM1023 – A V Ω % + - ~ Neon-filled digital indicator tube, 15.5mmCH top-viewing, for use with ZM1022 in digital multimeters
- ZM1024 – ZM1025 with a red contrast filter coating, for use with ZM1020
- ZM1025 – c/s Kc/s Mc/s μs ms ns s Neon-filled digital indicator tube, 15.5mmCH top-viewing, for use with ZM1022 in digital frequency counters
- ZM1030 – ZM1032 with a red contrast filter coating
- ZM1031 – ZM1031/01 without the ~
- ZM1031/01 – ZM1033/01 with a red contrast filter coating, for use with ZM1030
- ZM1032 – 0 1 2 3 4 5 6 7 8 9 Neon-filled digital indicator tube, 15.5mmCH side-viewing, no decimal point, 5 dual cathodes and separate odd/even anode compartments for biquinary multiplexing
- ZM1033/01 – + - ~ Neon-filled digital indicator tube, 15.5mmCH side-viewing, separate anode compartment for + , for use with ZM1032
- ZM1040 (Z522M) – ZM1042 with a red contrast filter coating
- ZM1041 – ZM1043 with a red contrast filter coating, for use with ZM1040
- ZM1041S – ZM1043S with a red contrast filter coating, for use with ZM1040
- ZM1042 (Z5220M) – 0 1 2 3 4 5 6 7 8 9 Neon-filled digital indicator tube, 30mmCH side-viewing, no decimal point
- ZM1043 – + - Neon-filled digital indicator tube, 30mmCH side-viewing, for use with ZM1042
- ZM1043S – Y X + W U Z - Neon-filled digital indicator tube, 30mmCH side-viewing, for use with ZM1042
- ZM1047 – ZM1049 with a red contrast filter coating, for use with ZM1040
- ZM1049 – T F S N Z Y G H M X Neon-filled digital indicator tube, side-viewing, for use with ZM1042 in numerical control systems
- ZM1050
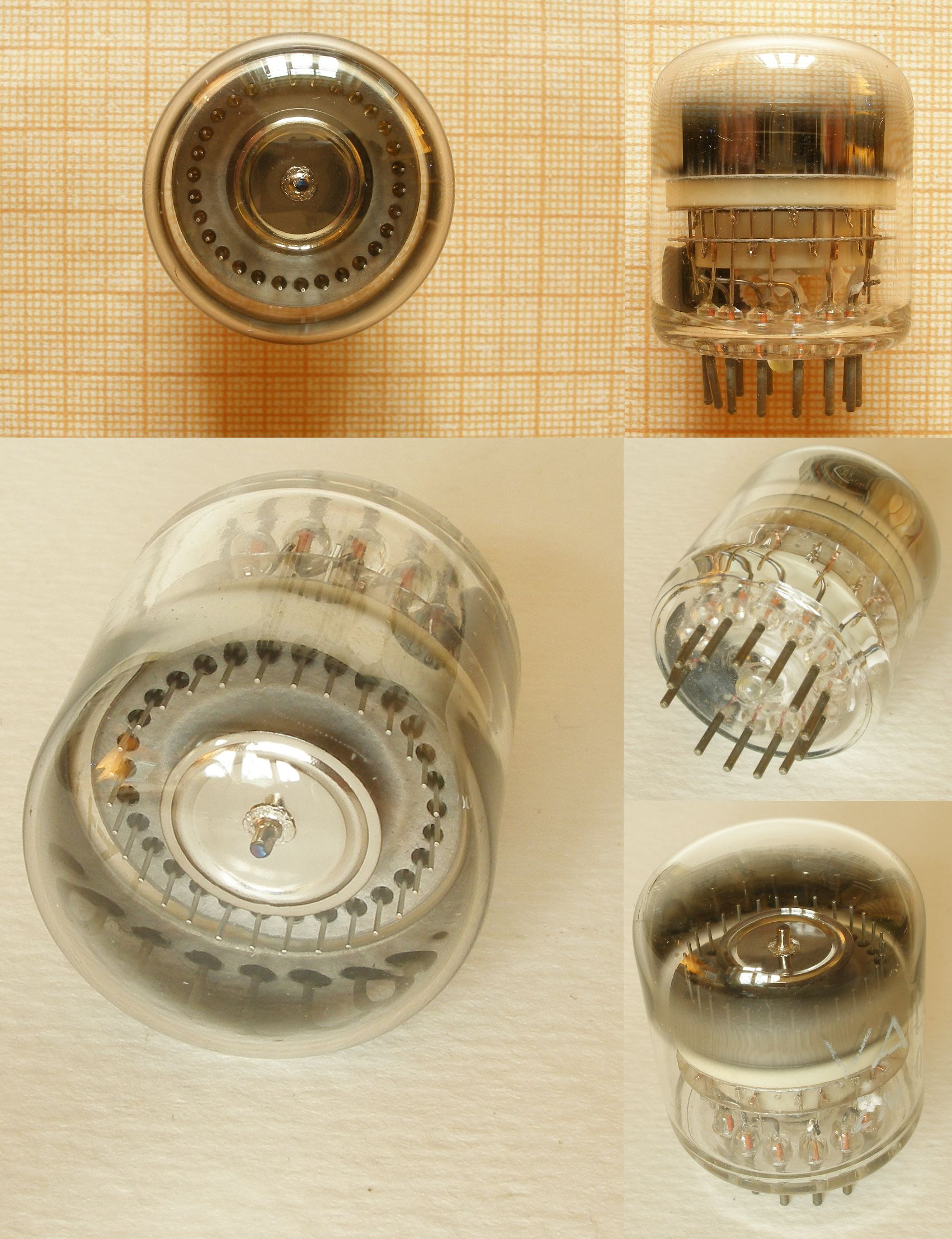
  ZM1070
  (Z550M, 8453) – Neon-filled digital indicator tube, top-viewing, dekatron-type readout with common anode and common cathodes, pulsating anode voltage, controlled by 5-volts sensitive starter electrodes, for transistorized circuits
- ZM1060 (Z505S) – Argon-filled, 50 kHz decade Counter/Selector Dekatron
- ZM1070 (Z504S, 8433) – Neon-filled, 5 kHz decade Counter/Selector Dekatron
- ZM1080 – ZM1082 with a red contrast filter coating
- ZM1081 – ZM1083 with a red contrast filter coating, for use with ZM1080
- ZM1082 – 0 1 2 3 4 5 6 7 8 9 Neon-filled digital indicator tube, 14mmCH side-viewing, no decimal point, probe electrode
- ZM1083 – + - ~ Neon-filled digital indicator tube, 14mmCH side-viewing, for use with ZM1082
- ZM1100 – 0 1 2 3 4 5 6 7 8 9 Neon-filled digital indicator tube, 15.5mmCH top-viewing
- ZM1120 – ZM1122 with a red contrast filter coating
- ZM1122 – 0 1 2 3 4 5 6 7 8 9 Miniature neon-filled digital indicator tube, 7.8mmCH top-viewing
- ZM1130 – ZM1132 with a red contrast filter coating
- ZM1131 – ZM1133 with a red contrast filter coating, for use with ZM1080
- ZM1132 – 0 1 2 3 4 5 6 7 8 9 Neon-filled digital indicator tube, side-viewing, left and right decimal point
- ZM1133 – + - ~ Neon-filled digital indicator tube, side-viewing, for use with ZM1132
- ZM1136L/R – ZM1138L/R with a red contrast filter coating
- ZM1137 – ZM1139 with a red contrast filter coating, for use with ZM1136L/R
- ZM1138L/R – 0 1 2 3 4 5 6 7 8 9 Neon-filled digital indicator tube, 13mmCH side-viewing, left or right decimal points (specify)
- ZM1139 – + - ~ Ω Neon-filled digital indicator tube, 13mmCH side-viewing, for use with ZM1138 in digital multimeters
- ZM1162 – 0 1 2 3 4 5 6 7 8 9 Long-life neon-filled digital indicator tube, 15.5mmCH top-viewing, no decimal point, rectangular envelope for close stacking in both axes
- ZM1170 – ZM1172 with a red contrast filter coating
- ZM1172 – 0 1 2 3 4 5 6 7 8 9 Neon-filled digital indicator tube, 15.5mmCH side-viewing, no decimal point
- ZM1174 – ZM1175 with a red contrast filter coating
- ZM1175 – 0 1 2 3 4 5 6 7 8 9 Neon-filled digital indicator tube, 15.5mmCH side-viewing, left decimal point
- ZM1176 – ZM1177 with a red contrast filter coating
- ZM1177 – ZM1175, but right decimal point
- ZM1180 – ZM1182 with a red contrast filter coating
- ZM1181 – ZM1183 with a red contrast filter coating, for use with ZM1180
- ZM1182 – 0 1 2 3 4 5 6 7 8 9 Neon-filled digital indicator tube, 16mmCH top-viewing, no decimal point, semi-rectangular envelope for close horizontal stacking
- ZM1183 – + - ~ Ω Neon-filled digital indicator tube, top-viewing, 13mmCH for use with ZM1182 in digital multimeters
- ZM1184D – ZM1185D with a red contrast filter coating
- ZM1185A (GR1420) – 1 2 3 4 5 6 U K E R Neon-filled digital indicator tube, 16mmCH top-viewing
- ZM1185D (GR1430) – ∇ Δ Neon-filled digital indicator tube, 16mmCH top-viewing, for use in elevators
- ZM1185E (GR1472) – 0 1 2 3 4 5 - t kg + Neon-filled digital indicator tube, 16mmCH top-viewing
- ZM1200 – Pandicon, multiplexed 14-digit display tube with decimal points and punctuation marks, pin connections on both ends
- ZM1202 – 12-Digit Pandicon
- ZM1204 – 10-Digit Pandicon
- ZM1206 – 8-Digit Pandicon
- ZM1210
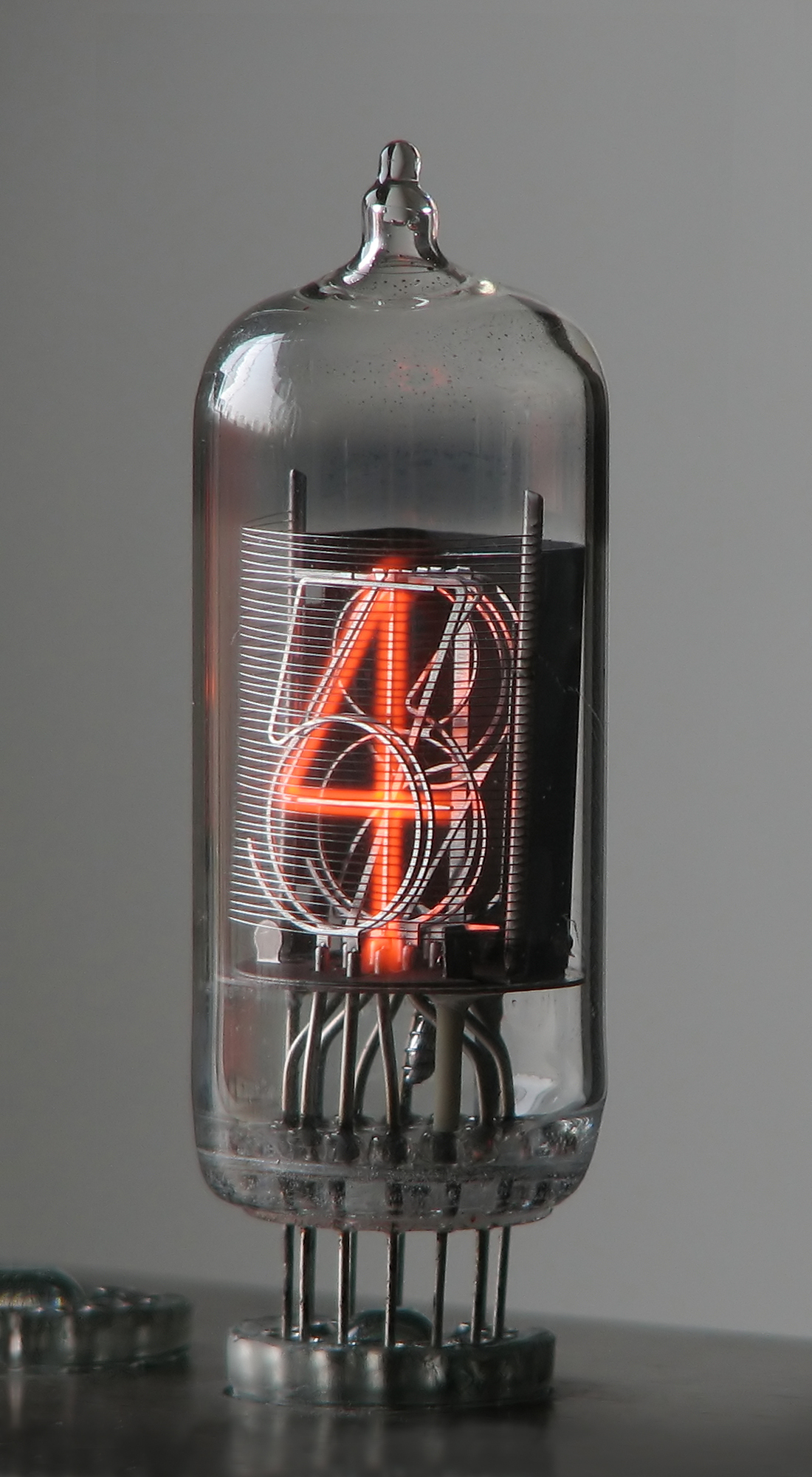
  ZM1212
  – ZM1212 with a red contrast filter coating
- ZM1212 – 0 1 2 3 4 5 6 7 8 9 Neon-filled digital indicator tube, 15.5mmCH side-viewing, left decimal point, all-glass wire-ended
- ZM1220 – ZM1222 with a red contrast filter coating
- ZM1222 – 0 1 2 3 4 5 6 7 8 9 Large neon-filled digital indicator tube, 40mmCH side-viewing
- ZM1230 – ZM1232 with a red contrast filter coating
- ZM1232 – 0 1 2 3 4 5 6 7 8 9 Neon-filled digital indicator tube, 15.5mmCH upside-down side-viewing, no decimal point
- ZM1240 – ZM1242 with a red contrast filter coating
- ZM1241 – ZM1243 with a red contrast filter coating, for use with ZM1240
- ZM1242 – 0 1 2 3 4 5 6 7 8 9 Neon-filled digital indicator tube, 16mmCH side-viewing, right decimal point
- ZM1243 – + - ~ Ω Neon-filled digital indicator tube, 16mmCH side-viewing, for use with ZM1242 in digital multimeters
- ZM1263 – ~ + - ⚫ Neon-filled digital indicator tube, 10mmCH side-viewing
- ZM1290 – ZM1292 with a red contrast filter coating
- ZM1292 – 0 1 2 3 4 5 6 7 8 9 Neon-filled digital indicator tube, 10mmCH side-viewing
- ZM1330 – ZM1332 with a red contrast filter coating
- ZM1331 – ZM1333 with a red contrast filter coating, for use with ZM1330
- ZM1332 – 0 1 2 3 4 5 6 7 8 9 Neon-filled digital indicator tube, 13.1mmCH side-viewing, left and right decimal points, all-glass wire-ended
- ZM1333 – + - ~ Ω Neon-filled digital indicator tube, 13.1mmCH side-viewing, all-glass wire-ended, for use with ZM1332 in digital multimeters
- ZM1334 – ZM1336 with a red contrast filter coating
- ZM1335 – ZM1337 with a red contrast filter coating, for use with ZM1334
- ZM1336 – 0 1 2 3 4 5 6 7 8 9 Neon-filled digital indicator tube, 13.1mmCH side-viewing, left and right decimal points, multiplex-capable
- ZM1337 – + - ~ Ω Neon-filled digital indicator tube, 13.0mmCH side-viewing, right decimal point (!), all-glass wire-ended, red contrast filter coating, for use with ZM1336 in digital multimeters
- ZM1350 – Varisymbol, planar neon-filled digital 40mm x 27mm fourteen-segment display tube, right decimal point, separate underscore text cursor, keep-alive cathode, multiplex-capable, viewing angle 160°
- ZM1360 – ZM1350 with 60mm x 40mm characters
- ZM1370 – ZM1350 with 20mm x 13mm characters
- ZM1410 – ZM1412 with a red contrast filter coating
- ZM1412 – Neon-filled digital seven-segment display tube, 8.6mmCH side-viewing, right decimal point and left punctuation mark, all-glass wire-ended
- ZM1500 – Pandicon, multiplexed 12-digit, 7-segment display tube
- ZM1550 – Planar neon-filled digital two-digit seven-segment display tube, right decimal points
- ZM1551 – Planar neon-filled digital 1 1/2-digit seven-segment display tube with + and - signs, right decimal points

Note: More Nixie tubes under standard - ZM and ETL examples

==== ZP ====
- ZP1000 – Boron trifluoride-filled Geiger-Müller tube, thermal neutrons
- ZP1010 – Boron trifluoride-filled Geiger-Müller tube, thermal neutrons
- ZP1020 – Boron trifluoride-filled Geiger-Müller tube, thermal neutrons
- ZP1070 – Subminiature Geiger-Müller tube, all-glass wire-ended
- ZP1080 – Halogen-quenched Geiger-Müller tube, β and γ
- ZP1100 – Halogen-quenched Geiger-Müller tube, γ; wire-ended
- ZP1200 – Halogen-quenched Geiger-Müller tube, γ
- ZP1300 – Halogen-quenched Geiger-Müller tube, γ and high-energy β
- ZP1330 – Halogen-quenched Geiger-Müller tube, for use in damp and/or saline atmosphere, β and γ
- ZP1400 – Halogen-quenched Geiger-Müller tube, 9mm diameter mica window, β and γ
- ZP1430 – Halogen-quenched Geiger-Müller tube, 27.8mm diameter mica window, α, β, γ
- ZP1490 – Halogen-quenched Geiger-Müller tube, 28mm diameter mica window, low-level α, β and γ
- ZP1600 – Halogen-quenched Geiger-Müller tube, 19.8 mm diameter mica window, X-rays, 6.0 to 20 keV energy, 60 to 200 pm wavelength range
- ZP1610 – Side window, organically quenched Geiger-Müller tube. 7 x 18 mm mica window; X-rays, 2.5 to 40 keV energy, 30 to 500 pm wavelength range
- ZP1700 – Halogen-quenched, cosmic-ray guard counter tube for low-background measurements; to be used with another radiation counter tube in an anticoincidence circuit
- ZP1800 – Halogen-quenched Geiger-Müller tube for use at temperatures up to 200 °C, γ
- ZP1810 – Halogen-quenched Geiger-Müller tube for use at temperatures up to 200 °C, γ, low sensitivity, up to 40 mGy/h
- ZP1860 – Halogen-quenched Geiger-Müller tube, β and γ

==== ZT ====
- ZT1000 – 21 kV, 5 A Mercury vapor triode thyratron

==== ZX ====
- ZX1000 – 800 V, 1140 A_{pk}, 13A_{avg} Ignitron
- ZX1051 – Water-cooled, 56 A_{avg} Ignitron
- ZX1052 – Water-cooled, 140 A_{avg} Ignitron
- ZX1053 – Water-cooled, 355 A_{avg} Ignitron
- ZX1060 – Water-cooled, 10 A_{avg} Ignitron
- ZX1061 – Water-cooled, 10 A_{avg} Ignitron
- ZX1062 – Water-cooled, 10 A_{avg} Ignitron
- ZX1063 – Water-cooled, 10 A_{avg} Ignitron

==== ZY ====
- ZY1000 (872B) – High voltage, half-wave mercury-vapor rectifier
- ZY1001/8008A – High voltage, half-wave mercury-vapor rectifier, 4-pin base with anode top cap
- ZY1002 – High voltage, half-wave mercury-vapor rectifier, E40 (Goliath) Edison screw lamp base with anode top cap

==== ZZ ====
- ZZ1000 – 81 V Voltage reference, 2-pin all-glass wire-ended
- ZZ1010 – 85 V Voltage reference
- ZZ1020 (STV85-8) – 82 V Voltage reference with primer electrode, 3-pin all-glass wire-ended
- ZZ1030 (STV500-0,1) – Quad 125 V Voltage references, noval base
- ZZ1031 – Quad Voltage reference, noval base
- ZZ1040 (STV100-60Z) – 100 V Voltage reference with primer electrode
- ZZ1050 – 82 V Voltage reference, 2-pin all-glass wire-ended

== List of European transmitting tubes ==
Note: Typecode explained above.

=== B - Backward-wave amplifier ===
==== BA ====
- BA9/20 – X-band, 20 mW, Forced-air cooled backward-wave oscillator

=== D - Rectifier incl. grid-controlled ===
==== DA ====
- DA1.5/75 – 1.5 kV, 75 W Half-wave power rectifier, triode TA1.5/75 without grid
- DA12/24000 – 12 kV, 24 kW Water-cooled half-wave power rectifier

==== DC ====
- DC1/50 – 1 kV, 75 mA Full-wave power rectifier, DC1/60 with dual anode top cap
- DC1/60 – DC1/50 with heater and dual anode on 4-pin base
- DC2/200 – 2 kV, 100 mA Full-wave power rectifier with dual anode top cap

==== DCG ====
- DCG1/125 – 1 kV, 125 mA Half-wave mercury-vapor rectifier with Edison screw lamp base and anode top cap
- DCG12/30 – 12 kV, 2.5 A Grid-controlled, half-wave mercury-vapor rectifier with anode top cap

==== DCX ====
- DCX4/1000 – 4 kV, 1 kW Half-wave xenon rectifier with anode top cap
- DCX4/5000 – 4 kV, 5 kW Half-wave xenon rectifier with anode top cap

==== DE ====
- DE2/200 – 2 kV, 100 mA Full-wave power rectifier with dual anode top cap

=== J - Magnetron ===
==== JP ====
- JP8/02B – 8.8 GHz, 25 W Magnetron
- JP9/15 – 9.345 to 9.405 GHz, 15 kW Forced-air cooled magnetron for pulsed service

==== JPT ====
- JPT9/01 – 9.15 to 9.60 GHz, 10 W Magnetron

=== K - Klystron ===
==== KB ====
- KB9/150W – X-band, 150 W Water-cooled, dual-resonator klystron

==== KS ====
- KS7/85 – 6.5 to 7.5 GHz, 85 mW Reflex klystron

=== L - Traveling-wave tube ===
==== LA ====
- LA9/3 – 7 to 11.5 GHz Forward-wave amplifier
- LA16/2 – 11.5 to 18 GHz Forward-wave amplifier

=== M - AF modulator Triode ===
==== MA ====
- MA4/600 – 4 kV, 600 W Radiation-cooled triode

==== MB ====
- MB1/50 – 1 kV, 50 W Radiation-cooled triode
- MB2/200 – 2 kV, 200 W Radiation-cooled triode

==== MY ====
- MY3/275 – 3 kV, 275 W Radiation-cooled triode

==== MZ ====
- MZ2/200 – 2 kV, 200 W Radiation-cooled triode

=== P - Pentode ===
==== PA ====
- PA12/15 – 15 kW Water-cooled shortwave pentode
- PA12/20 – 20 kW Water-cooled pentode made by Philips and used in the 1930s and 1940s

==== PAL ====
- PAL12/15 – Air-cooled version of PAW12/15

==== PAW ====
- PAW12/15 – 15 kW Water-cooled shortwave pentode

==== PB ====
- PB2/200 – 200 W Shortwave pentode
- PB3/1000 – 1 kW Shortwave pentode

==== PC ====
- PC03/3 – 3 W Shortwave pentode
- PC3/1000 – 1 kW Shortwave pentode

==== PE ====
- PE04/10 – 10 W Shortwave pentode
- PE1/100 (YL1200) – 100 W Shortwave pentode

=== Q - Tetrode ===
==== QB ====
- QB2/75 – 75 W Beam-tetrode
- QB5/2000 – 2 kW Beam-tetrode

==== QBL ====
- QBL4/800 – Air-cooled 800 W beam-tetrode
- QBL5/3500 – Air-cooled 3500 W beam-tetrode

==== QBW ====
- QBW5/3500 – Water-cooled 3500 W beam-tetrode

==== QC ====
- QC05/15 – 15 W Beam-tetrode
- QC05/35 – 35 W Beam-tetrode

==== QE ====
- QE04/10 – 10 W Beam-tetrode
- QE05/40 (6146) – 40 W Radiation-cooled output beam-tetrode, popular amongst radio amateurs as a final RF amplifier
- QE08/200 – 200 W Beam-tetrode

==== QEL ====
- QEL1/150 – Air-cooled 150 W beam-tetrode
- QEL1/250 – Air-cooled 250 W beam-tetrode

==== QEP ====
- QEP20/18 – 18 W Beam-tetrode for use as a pulse modulator

==== QQC ====
- QQC03/14 – 14 W Dual beam-tetrode

==== QQE ====
- QQE02/5 (6939) – 5 W Dual beam-tetrode
- QQE03/12 (6360) – 12 W Dual beam-tetrode
- QQE03/20 (6252) – 20 W Dual beam-tetrode
- QQE04/5 (7377) – 5 W Dual beam-tetrode
- QQE06/40 (5894, YL1060) – 40 W dual beam-tetrode, internally neutralized, Septar base with dual anode top cap

==== QQV ====
- QQV02/6 – 6 W dual beam-tetrode
- QQV03/20A – 20 W Radiation-cooled split-anode tetrode made by Mullard and used in the 1940s, 1950s and 1960s as a VHF frequency-doubling output stage with balanced output.
- QQV07/50 – 50 W Dual beam-tetrode

==== QQZ ====
- QQZ03/20 (8118, YL1020) – 20 W Dual beam-tetrode
- QQZ06/40 (YL1030) – 40 W Dual beam-tetrode

==== QV ====
- QV04/7 – 7 W Beam-tetrode
- QV05/25 (807) – 25 W Radiation-cooled output beam-tetrode made by Mullard.
- QV2/250C – 250 W Beam-tetrode

==== QY ====
- QY3/65 – 65 W Beam-tetrode
- QY5/3000A – 3 kW Beam-tetrode
- QY5/3000W – Water-cooled version of QY5-3000A

==== QYS ====
- QYS50/P40 – Pulsed power tetrode, Silica envelope, 50 kV anode voltage, considerable x-radiation, 810 °C anode temperature at 700 W anode dissipation, 40 A anode current at duty factor 0.0005, V_{g1Cut-off} (I_{A}=1 mA@V_{A}=55 kV): > -3.4 kV, g_{m}: 38 mS

==== QZ ====
- QZ06/20 – 25 W VHF Power tetrode up to 175 MHz

=== R - Rectifier incl. grid-controlled ===
==== RG ====
- RG1000/3000 – 1 kV, 3 A Half-wave mercury-vapor rectifier with anode top cap

==== RGQ ====
- RGQ7.5/0.6, RSQ7.5/0.6 (Grid-controlled) – 7.5 kV, 600 mA Half-wave mercury-vapor rectifier with anode top cap
- RGQ20/5, RSQ15/40 (Grid-controlled) – 20 kV, 5 A Half-wave mercury-vapor rectifier with anode top cap

=== T - RF amplifier/oscillator Triode ===
==== TA ====
- TA04/5 – 400 V, 50 W Radiation-cooled power triode
- TA1.5/75 – 1.5 kV, 75 W Radiation-cooled power triode
- TA4/2000K – 4 kV, 2 kW Air-cooled power triode made by Philips in the 1930s
- TA18/100000 – 18 kV, 100 kW Water-cooled power triode

==== TB ====
- TB04/8 – Directly heated Doorknob VHF power triode up to 600 MHz
- TB2.5/400 – 2.5 kV, 300 W Radiation-cooled power triode
- TB5/2500 – 5 kV, 2.5 kW Radiation-cooled power triode

==== TBL ====
- TBL2/300 – 2 kV, 300 W Forced air-cooled power triode
- TBL15/125 – 15 kV, 125 kW Forced air-cooled power triode, 3-phase filament structure

==== TBW ====
- TBW6/14 – 6 kV, 14 kW Water-cooled power triode
- TBW15/125 – 15 kV, 125 kW Water-cooled power triode, 3-phase filament structure

==== TC ====
- TC03/5 – RF power triode up to 85 MHz, 5 W
- TC2/250 – RF power triode up to 20 MHz, 250 W

==== TD ====
- TD03/5 – Indirectly heated disk-seal UHF power triode up to 2 GHz
- TD03/10 – Indirectly heated disk-seal UHF power triode up to 2.8 W, 3.75 GHz

- TD03/10F – TD03/10 with internal feedback for use as an oscillator

- TD04/20 – Indirectly heated disk-seal UHF power triode up to 13.5 W, 1 GHz
- TD1/100C = 2C39BA – Indirectly heated, ceramic disk-seal UHF power triode up to 24 W, 3.5 GHz
- TD2/400 – Directly heated, ceramic disk-seal UHF power triode up to 600 W, 900 MHz
- TD2/500 – Directly heated, ceramic disk-seal UHF power triode up to 500 W, 940 MHz

==== TE ====
- TE05/10 – RF power triode up to 150 MHz

==== TX ====
- TX12/12W – Water-cooled RF power triode
- TX12/20W – Water-cooled RF power triode
- TX10/4000 – Power triode, Silica envelope, 12 kV anode voltage, 4 kW anode dissipation, 1.6 A cathode current, g_{m}: 4.5 mS, for use as self-excited high-power oscillator in induction heating equipment.

==== TY ====
- TY2/125 – 135 W VHF power triode up to 200 MHz
- TY12/50A – Forced-air cooled 45 kW RF power triode up to 30 MHz
- TY12/50W – Water-cooled 50 kW RF power triode up to 30 MHz

==== TYS ====
- TYS2/250 – Power triode, Silica envelope, 2.5 kV anode voltage, 250 W anode dissipation
- TYS4/500 – Power triode, Silica envelope
- TYS5/1000 – Power triode, Silica envelope
- TYS5/2000 – Power triode, Silica envelope
- TYS5/3000 – Power triode, Silica envelope, 6 kV anode voltage, 950 °C anode temperature at 3.5 kW anode dissipation, 2.8 A cathode current, g_{m}: 15 mS. Used in RF generators for induction hardening.

=== X - Thyratron ===
==== XGQ ====
- XGQ2/6400 – 2 kV, 6.4 A Mercury-vapor tetrode thyratron with anode and grid1 top caps

==== XR ====
- XR1/1600 (5545) – 1 kV, 1.6 A Inert gas-filled triode thyratron with anode top cap
- XR1/6400 – 1 kV, 6.4 A Inert gas-filled triode thyratron with anode top cap

== Compagnie des Lampes (1921, "French Mazda") and Mazda-Belvu ==
Not to be confused with Compagnie des Lampes (1888, see above) nor with British Mazda (see above).

The 1921 incarnation of La Compagnie des Lampes (since 1953 as Lampe Mazda) made light bulbs and electronic tubes under the French Mazda brand. Many of their tubes were also available from Compagnie Industrielle Française des Tubes Electroniques (CIFTE) under their Mazda-Belvu brand, which otherwise used mostly EIA, RETMA and Mullard–Philips tube designations.

Examples:

Before 1949:

- 1883 – Indirectly heated, 350 V/125 mA full-wave rectifier, 5 V/1.6 A heater
- 2XM600 – Directly heated, 10 kV/250 mA half-wave mercury-vapor rectifier, 2.5 V/5 A heater
- 4Y25 = 807 – Indirectly heated beam tetrode
- RETMA tube 6H8G
- RCA-800 tubes 879, 884

Since 1949 with a fire pot logo:

- RMA tube 2E30
- 3T20 – Directly heated power triode, graphite anode
- 3T100 – Directly heated power triode, graphite anode
- 4Y50 – Indirectly heated beam tetrode
- E1 – Electrometer tetrode
- E2 – Dual electrometer tetrode
- ST130 – 130 V Neon-filled voltage reference

Since 1953 as LAMPE MAZDA:

- RMA tube 2G21
- 4Y100 = 7745 – Dual beam tetrode
- RCA-800 tubes 829, 832
- 927 – Gas-filled phototube
- 929 – Vacuum phototube
- EIA tubes 6196, 6250
- E5 – Subminiature electrometer tetrode, all-glass wire-ended

Since 1959 with a Faravahar logo related to Ahura Mazda:

- 3T50 – Directly heated power triode, thoriated-tungsten filament, graphite anode
- 4Y75 – Directly heated power triode
- 6P9 = 6BM5 – Power pentode, Miniature 7-pin base
- RETMA tube 6K8
- 78A – Directly heated, educational diode
- EIA tubes 7233, 7242, 7377, 8418
- E6 – Subminiature dual electrometer tetrode, all-glass wire-ended
- E7, E9 – Subminiature electrometer pentodes, all-glass wire-ended
- Mullard–Philips tubes ECF202, ECL802, ED501, EF816, EL503, EY81F, EY802, GY86, GY802, PY81F
- F7024A (Diode), F7024C (Triode), F7024E (Tetrode), F7024L (Pentode) – Set of 4 educational tubes
- F9116 – Electrometer tetrode
- K25000A1 – Directly heated, 25 kV/70 mA half-wave rectifier, 2.5 V/9 A heater

== List of Russian tubes ==
=== Standard tubes ===
Note: Typecode explained above.

- 6J1J 6Ж1Ж (954) – Indirectly heated Acorn-type sharp-cutoff pentode, 6.3 V heater
- 6K1J 6К1Ж (956) – Indirectly heated Acorn-type remote-cutoff pentode, 6.3 V heater
- 6L1P 6Л1П – Nonode for FM quadrature detection
- 6N1P 6Н1П – Dual triode, similar to 6DJ8/ECC88
- 6N2P 6Н2П – Dual triode, similar to 12AX7/ECC83
- 6N3P 6Н3П (2C51) – Dual triode
- 6N8S 6Н8С (6SN7/ECC32) – Dual triode
- 6N9S 6Н9С (6SL7) – Dual triode
- 6N13S 6Н13С (6AS7G) – Dual power triode
- 6N14P 6Н14П – Dual RF/VHF triode, similar to ECC84/6CW7
- 6N23P 6Н23П (6DJ8/ECC88) – Dual triode
- 6N24P 6Н24П (ECC89/6FC7, 6ES8) – Dual RF/VHF triode for cascode amps
- 6P1P 6П1П – Power pentode, similar to 6AQ5/EL90
- 6P3S 6П3С – Beam-power tetrode, similar to 6L6GB
- 6P3S-E 6П3С-Е – Beam-power tetrode, similar to 5881/6L6WGB
- 6P6S 6П6С (6V6) – Beam-power tetrode
- 6P14P 6П14П (6BQ5/EL84) – Power pentode
- 6P41S 6П41С – Beam power tetrode, designed for TV sets, used in line output stages, similar to 7868.
- 6P45S 6П45С (6KG6/EL509) – Beam power tetrode, designed for TV sets, used in line output stages.
- 6S1J 6С1Ж (955) – Indirectly heated Acorn-type triode, 6.3 V heater
- 6S19P 6С19П – Output triode

=== Professional tubes ===
Note: Typecode explained above.

- V1-0.15/55 В1-0.15/55 – 55 kV, 150 mA Half-wave rectifier
- VI1-5/20 ВИ1-5/20 – 20 kV, 5 A Half-wave pulse rectifier
- G-807 Г-807 – Shortwave transmitter tube (the Russian 807 analogue).
- GI-7B ГИ-7Б – Impulse tube
- GM-70 ГМ-70 – Modulator tube
- GK-71 ГК-71 - RF generation and power amplification, 125 watt pentode, direct heating.
- GS-31B ГС-31Б – UHF transmitter tube
- GU-29 ГУ-29 – VHF transmitter tube, dual beam tetrode, 20W max. anode dissipation per section.
- GU-32 ГУ-32 – VHF transmitter tube, dual beam tetrode, 15W max. anode dissipation per section.
- GU-50 ГУ-50 – VHF transmitter pentode, similar to the German LS-50 (no direct U.S. equivalent)
- GU-78B ГУ-78Б – VHF transmitter tetrode
- GU-81M ГУ-81M – RF generation and power amplification, 450 watt pentode, direct heating.
- I3-70-0.8A И3-70-0.8 – 800 V, 70 A Ignitron
- I3-200-1.5A И3-200-1.5 – 1.5 kV, 200 A Ignitron
- LP-4 ЛП-4 – Linear trochotron, 26-pin Acorn-type all-glass wire-ended,
- SG203K СГ203К – 82 V Voltage reference
- SG204K СГ204К – 164 V Voltage reference
- TGI1-270/12 ТГИ1-270/12 – 12 kV, 270 A Hydrogen thyratron

=== Indicator tubes ===
- IN-33 ИН-33 – Neon-filled, planar, dual 105-segment linear glow-transfer plasma bar graph display with three cathode strings, for use in VU meters etc.; similar to BG16101

•	•	•	•
•	•	•	•
•	•	•	•
•	•	•	•

- ITM2-M ИТМ2-М – Four-color phosphored-thyratron latching pixel; 4x4 array of 4 subminiature dual-starter luminescent thyratrons each for the colors red, yellow, green and blue (thus, 5 intensities per color yields 5^{4} = 625 colors), 4x4 matrix of 10-volts sensitive starter electrodes, cubic envelope for easy stacking in both axes, 12-pin all-glass wire-ended, similar to today's RGBA LEDs
- ITS1 ИТС1 – Green phosphored-thyratron latching seven-segment display, no decimal point, 5-volts sensitive starter electrodes, all-glass wire-ended, rectangular envelope for easy stacking in both axes
- MTX-90 МТХ-90 – Small neon-filled thyratron for use as a latching single-dot indicator, top-viewing, top of envelope acts as a magnifier, all-glass wire-ended, comes with a blob of solder on the end of each wire for rapid installing, like today's ball grid arrays

== List of other number tubes ==
=== 1 ===
- 175HQ – Ultra high reliability pentode for use in long-haul submarine communications cable repeaters

==== 1600s ====
- 1602 – Directly heated power triode used for A.F. amplification with low microphonics. 7.5 volt filament. 12 watts of A.F. operating in Class-A. 15 watts of low R.F. operating in Class-C. Similar to type 10.
- 1603 – Indirectly heated pentode used for A.F. amplification with low microphonics. Similar to types 6U7, 57, 6D6 and 6C6. UX6 Base.
- 1608 – Directly heated triode giving 20 watts at up to 45 MHz. 2.5 volt heater/filament. UX base.
- 1609 – Directly heated pentode used for A.F. amplification with low microphonics. American 5-Pin(UY)base.
- 1610 – Directly heated pentode specially designed for use as a crystal oscillator. 2.5 volt heater/filament, American 5-Pin base.
- 1612 – Pentagrid converter; low-microphonics version of type 6L7. Both control grids (1 and 3) are sharp-cutoff.
- 1619 – Beam Power Tetrode, similar to 6L6 with directly heated filament, common in World War II battle tank transmitters.
- 1624, 1625 – Very similar to the 807, but with different heater voltage
- 1626 – RF triode, very similar to 6J5 but with 12.6 volt filament
- 1629 – Tuning indicator tube with DC amplifier triode unit
- 1630 – Indirectly heated, orbital-beam, secondary-emission, 12-pin Jumbo Acorn-type UHF hexode
- 1633 – Dual triode, equivalent to 6SN7 with 25 volt heater (World War II aircraft use)
- 1635 – Indirectly heated, 2×3 W dual AF power triode, Octal base
- 1636 – Secondary emission UHF beam deflection tube, used as a balanced mixer up to 600 MHz
- 1650 – High-altitude version of the 955 Acorn-type triode
- 1680 – Dual-control heptode for use as a NAND gate in a coincidence circuit in IBM computers, 6BE6/EK90 with a sharp-cutoff grid no.3

=== 2 ===
- 24B1 – Trigatron
- 24B9 – Trigatron
- 29C1 – Directly heated saturated-emission diode; acts as a heating current-controlled, variable series resistor in voltage/current stabilizer circuits.

==== 200s ====
- 203A – 100 W, Directly heated RF transmitter power triode, 4-pin base, anode on top cap
- 204A – 250 W, Directly heated RF transmitter power triode, 3-pin base, anode on top cap
- 205D – 14 W, Directly heated AF or modulator power triode, 4-pin base
- 207 – 10 kW, Water-cooled, directly heated RF transmitter power triode
- 210T – Directly heated RF transmitter power triode, 4-pin base, similar to type 10 triode with an isolantite base
- 210DET – Cossor directly heated, 2 volts, special detector
- 210HF – Cossor, directly heated, 2 volts, triode
- 210HL – Cossor, directly heated, 2 volts, triode
- 210LF – Cossor, directly heated, 2 volts, triode
- 210PG – Cossor, directly heated, 2 volts, variable-mu pentagrid
- 210RC – Cossor, directly heated, 2 volts, very high impedance triode
- 210SPT – Cossor, directly heated, 2 volts, HF pentode
- 210VPT – Cossor, directly heated, 2 volts, HF variable-mu shielded pentode
- 211 – 260 W, Directly heated AF or modulator power triode now favored by audiophiles; Jumbo 4-pin base
- 212E – 275 W, Directly heated RF transmitter power triode, 4-pin base
- 215P – Cossor, directly heated AF power triode
- 220B – 10 kW, Water-cooled, directly heated AF/modulator power triode
- 228A – 5 kW, Directly heated RF/AF power triode
- 230XP – Cossor, directly heated power triode
- 232C – 25 kW, Water-cooled, directly heated RF transmitter power triode
- 236A – 20 kW, Water-cooled, directly heated RF transmitter power triode
- 240B – Cossor, directly heated dual AF power triode
- 241B – 275 W, Directly heated AF/modulator power triode, 3-pin base, anode on top cap
- 242A – Directly heated AF/modulator power triode, 4-pin base
- 250TH – 250 W, Directly heated AF/modulator power triode, 4-pin base, anode on top cap
- 254A – 20 W, Directly heated RF transmitter power triode, 4-pin base, anode on top cap
- 261A – 125 W, Directly heated AF/modulator power triode, 4-pin base
- 268A – 25 W, Directly heated power triode, 4-pin base, anode on top cap
- 270A – 350 W, Directly heated AF/RF power triode, 4-pin base, anode on top cap
- 275A – 17 W, Directly heated AF power triode, 4-pin base
- 276A – 125 W, Directly heated AF/RF power triode, 4-pin base
- 279A – 1.2 kW, Directly heated AF/RF power triode
- 295A – 100 W, Directly heated AF/RF power triode, 4-pin base
- 298A – 100 kW, Water-cooled, directly heated power triode

=== 3 ===
==== 300s ====
- 300B – 40 watt directly heated power triode, 4-pin base
- 316A = VT191 – Directly heated Doorknob-type UHF power triode up to 750 MHz
- 322 – Oil can-type disk-seal UHF clipper power diode, 800 V_{PIV}, 15 W, 1500 MHz
- 328 – Tungar bulb, a low-voltage, gas-filled, full wave rectifier for charging 12V lead-acid batteries at 1.3 A
- 368A – Directly heated Doorknob UHF power triode, graphite anode, up to 1.7 GHz
- 388A – Directly heated Doorknob UHF power triode, graphite anode, up to 1.7 GHz

=== 4 ===
- 4XP – Cossor, directly heated power triode
- 41MP – Cossor, indirectly heated power triode

==== 400s ====
- 402P – Cossor, indirectly heated power triode, 7-pin base
- 416B – Planar SHF power triode, 500 mW output at 4 GHz
- 416D – Planar SHF power triode with BeO spacers, 5 W output at 4 GHz
- 446A – Early Lighthouse UHF triode, 10 dB noise figure at 1 GHz
- 450TH – Early Eimac high-mu power triode, 450 watt anode dissipation to 40 MHz
- 455A – Ultra high reliability pentode for use in submarine communications cable repeaters

==== 4000s ====
Philips:

- 4065 – Directly heated electrometer triode, grid current ≤125 fA, 4-pin all-glass wire-end, for probe amplifiers
- 4613 – Directly heated power triode, 4-pin base
- 4614 – Indirectly heated power triode, 5-pin base
- 4641 – Directly heated power triode, 4-pin base
- 4671/E1C (955) – Indirectly heated Acorn triode
- 4672/E1F (954) – Indirectly heated Acorn pentode
- 4674 – Indirectly heated Acorn diode
- 4675 – 4671/E1C with a 4 Volts heater
- 4676 – 4672/E1F with a 4 Volts heater
- 4678 (EM1) – Indirectly heated tuning indicator
- 4683 – Directly heated power triode, side-contact 8 base
- 4695/E2F (956) – Indirectly heated Acorn pentode

RCA:

- 4042 – Ceramic/metal pencil-type disk-seal UHF power triode for pulsed operation up to 425 W
- 4062A – Ceramic/metal pencil-type disk-seal SHF power triode up to 4 GHz, mu = 100, P_{anode} = 10 W
- 4560 – Character generator monoscope for text mode video rendering in early computer monitors, with a square target having letters, digits and symbols stenciled into it in a customer-supplied 8x8 array. An electron beam selects and scans a character, both by appropriate electrostatic deflection, and generates an analog video signal; cf. CK1414, TH9503
- 4598, 7539, 7828, 8087, 8098 – Graphechon dual-electron gun scan conversion tubes, analog video transcoders with simultaneous R/W capability for realtime resolution and frame rate transcoding between different analog video standards. This was achieved by a CRT/camera tube combination; the CRT part writes onto a thin, dielectric target; the camera part reads the generated charge pattern at a different scan rate from the back side of this target. The setup could also be used as a genlock

Standard Telephones and Cables:

- 4205E = 205E – Directly heated power triode, 4-pin bayonet base with offset pin
- 4270A = 270A = 3C/350E – Directly heated power triode, 3-pin base
- 4275A = 275A – Directly heated power triode, 4-pin base
- 4300A = 300A – Directly heated power triode, 4-pin base
- 4307A = 307A – Power pentode similar to the output beam-tetrode type 807. It differs from an 807 by being a directly heated pentode rather than an indirectly heated beam-tetrode. Both types are contained in an ST-16 bulb with an anode cap and 5-pin "American" UY base

The SY4307A is historically notable because a pair of them in parallel Class-C was used as the output stage in a transmitter built in secret by Australian soldiers in Japanese-occupied Portuguese Timor during World War II in 1942. This transmitter, now reconstructed and on display at the Australian War Memorial in Canberra, was called "Winnie the War Winner".
- 4307AF – 4307A qualified for use in standard aircraft radio

=== 5 ===
- 5BP4 – Five-inch CRT used in pre-World War II television receivers, such as the RCA TRK-5 and in early radars such as the SCR-268 and SCR-270.
- 5CEP11 (blue, short persistence); 10VP15, 5AKP15, 5DKP15, 5ZP15 (blue-green, extremely short); 5BNP16, 5CEP16, 5DKP16, 5ZP16 (violet/near-ultraviolet, very short); 5AKP24, 5AUP24, 5DKP24, 5ZP24 (green, short); 131QP55 (blue-green, very short); 131QP56 (blue-violet, very short) – CRT-type flying-spot scanners for use in a telecine

==== 500s ====
- 527 – High-mu power triode up to 300 W
- 559 – Lighthouse-type disk-seal UHF diode
- 592 = 3-200A3 – Medium-mu power triode up to 200 W, 150 MHz

=== 6 ===
- 6P10 – Ultra high reliability pentode for use in short-haul submarine communications cable repeaters
- 6P12 – Ultra high reliability pentode for use in long-haul submarine communications cable repeaters

=== 7 ===
- 7JP1 – Monochrome cathode ray tube for use in early postwar oscilloscopes. Electrostatic deflection, P1 green, short-persistence phosphor, 7-inch (180 mm) screen.
- 7JP4 – Monochrome cathode ray tube common in early postwar TV receivers. Electrostatic deflection, P4 white, medium-persistence phosphor, 7-inch (180 mm) screen.
- 7JP7 – Monochrome cathode ray tube for use in early postwar radar displays. Electrostatic deflection, P7 blue-white, long-persistence phosphor, 5 1/2-inch (140 mm) screen.

==== 700s ====
- 703A – Directly heated Doorknob UHF power triode up to 1.5 GHz
- 713A – Indirectly heated Little Doorknob UHF pentode, Bakelite Octal base
- 717A (CV3594, VT269) – 713A with a metal shield and a low loss mica-filled phenolic resin Octal base

=== 8 ===
==== 800s ====
- 800 – Directly heated V.H.F. power triode, giving 35 watts up to 60 MHz and 18 watts at 180 MHz. American 4-Pin(UX)base with side locating pin.
- 801 – Directly heated power triode, used in pairs in Class-B in A.M. modulation sections of transmitters giving up to 45 watts of power at 60 MHz and 22 watts at 120 MHz.
- 802 – Indirectly heated H.F. power pentode, giving 8 watts up to 30 MHz and 4 watts at 110 MHz.
- 803 – Directly heated H.F. power pentode, giving 50 watts up to 20 MHz and 25 watts at 70 MHz.
- 804 – Directly heated H.F. power pentode, giving 20 watts up to 15 MHz and 10 watts at 10 MHz.
- 805 – Directly heated H.F. high-mu triode, giving 140 watts up to 30 MHz and 70 watts at 85 MHz.
- 806 – Directly heated H.F. high-mu triode, giving 390 watts up to 30 MHz 195 watts at 100 MHz.
- 807 – Indirectly heated H.F. beam power tetrode, giving 25 watts up to 30 MHz and 12 watts at 125 MHz. A variation of type 6L6 originally designed as a Class-C transmitter tube. Later used in pairs as push-pull outputs for high-wattage Class-AB_{2} audio amplifiers. Also used as a horizontal output tube in early TV receivers. One of the first commercial tubes that used the top cap to connect the anode (instead of the control grid) to the circuit.
- 808 – Directly heated H.F. high-mu triode, giving 140 watts up to 30 MHz and 70 watts at 130 MHz.
- 809 – Directly heated H.F. high-mu triode, giving 55 watts up to 27 MHz and 30 watts at 100 MHz.
- 810 – Directly heated H.F. triode, 10 volt filament and Zirconium Carbide anode. Base fits R.C.A. UT-541A Socket.
- 811A – Directly heated H.F. triode, 6.3 volt filament, 88 watts
- 813 – Beam Power Tetrode possessing about 5 times the Anode dissipation of an 807.
- 814 – A directly heated Beam Power Tetrode giving about 130 watts at 30 MHz and 65 watts at 100 MHz operating in Class-C.
- 815 – An indirectly heated dual beam power pentode. Octal base.
- 825 – First commercially available klystrode, a VHF/UHF linear-beam transmitting tube, similar to a klystron
- 829 – A dual indirectly heated beam power tetrode. Two 6.3 volt heaters sharing a common tap.
- 830 – A directly heated triode giving about 50 watts at 15 MHz and 7.5 watts at 60 MHz operating in Class-C.
- 831 – A directly heated triode giving about 400 watts at 20 MHz and 200 watts at 60 MHz operating in Class-C. 11 volt heater/filament.
- 833 – A larger directly heated high-mu triode giving about 1 kW at 30 MHz and 500 watts at 45 MHz operating in Class-C. Usable up to 100 MHz at reduced power, (400 W). 10 volt heater/filament drawing 10 A. The anode of this device is fabricated from tantalum. Anode current of 800 mA with an anode voltage of 3 kV and grid voltage of zero. Anode current of 4.3 A at a voltage of 750 with 350 volt on the grid. Uses two-part R.C.A socket assembly UT-103.

- 833A – Improved 833.

- 834 – A directly heated triode giving 58 watts at 100 MHz and 25 watts at 350 MHz operating in Class-C. 7.5 volt heater/filament. Fitted with an American 4-Pin, (UX4), base with side locating pin.
- 836 – An indirectly heated high vacuum rectifier with a peak inverse voltage of 5 kV and peak anode current of 1 ampere. 2.5 volt heater.
- 837 – An indirectly heated pentode giving 11 watts at 20 MHz and 5 watts at 80 MHz. operating in Class-C. 12.6 volt heater.
- 838 – A directly heated triode giving about 100 watts at 30 MHz operating in Class-C. 10 volt heater/filament.
- 841 – A directly heated high-mu triode giving about 10 watts at 6 MHz and 5 watts at 170 MHz operating in Class-C. 7.5 volt heater/filament.
- 842 – A directly heated triode giving about 3 watts at 6 MHz operating in Class-C. 7.5 volt heater/filament.
- 843 – An indirectly heated tetrode giving gain at 6 MHz and usable up to 200 MHz operating in Class-C. 2.5 volt heater/filament.
- 844 – A directly heated triode giving gain at 6 MHz and usable up to 155 MHz operating in Class-C. 2.5 volt heater/filament.
- 845 – A directly heated triode giving up to 24 watts of undistorted power in Class-A at audio frequency with an anode voltage of 1250. 10 volt heater/filament.
- 849 – A directly heated triode giving gain at 3 MHz operating in Class-C. Two 849s, working in push-pull Class-B are capable of delivering 1.1 kW of audio output with an anode voltage of 3 kV. Usable up to 30 MHz. 11 volt filament/heater.
- 850 – A directly heated tetrode giving 120 watts of power gain up to 13 MHz and 50 watts at 100 MHz, operating in Class-C. 10 volt heater/filament.
- 851 – A directly heated triode giving 1.5 kW of power up to 3 MHz operating in Class-C. 11 volt heater/filament.
- 852 – A directly heated triode giving 75 W of power up to 30 MHz operating in Class-C. 10 volt heater/filament.
- 857B – Large mercury-vapor rectifier used in 50 kW class broadcast transmitters. 22 kV anode voltage, 10 A anode current. Filament 5 V @ 30 A
- 860 – A directly heated tetrode giving 105 W of power up to 30 MHz and 50 watts at 120 MHz operating in Class-C. 10 volt heater/filament.
- 861 – A directly heated triode giving 400 W of power up to 20 MHz and 200 watts at 60 MHz operating in Class-C. 11 volt heater/filament.
- 862 – Large water-cooled triode for broadcast/industrial applications. Used in experimental 500 kW transmitter at WLW.
- 864 – A directly heated general-purpose, low-microphonics triode with a maximum anode voltage of 135 volts and anode current of 3.5 mA. 1.1 volt heater/filament.
- 865 – A directly heated tetrode giving 30 W of power up to 15 MHz 15 watts at 70 MHz operating in Class-C. 7.5 volt heater/filament.
- 866
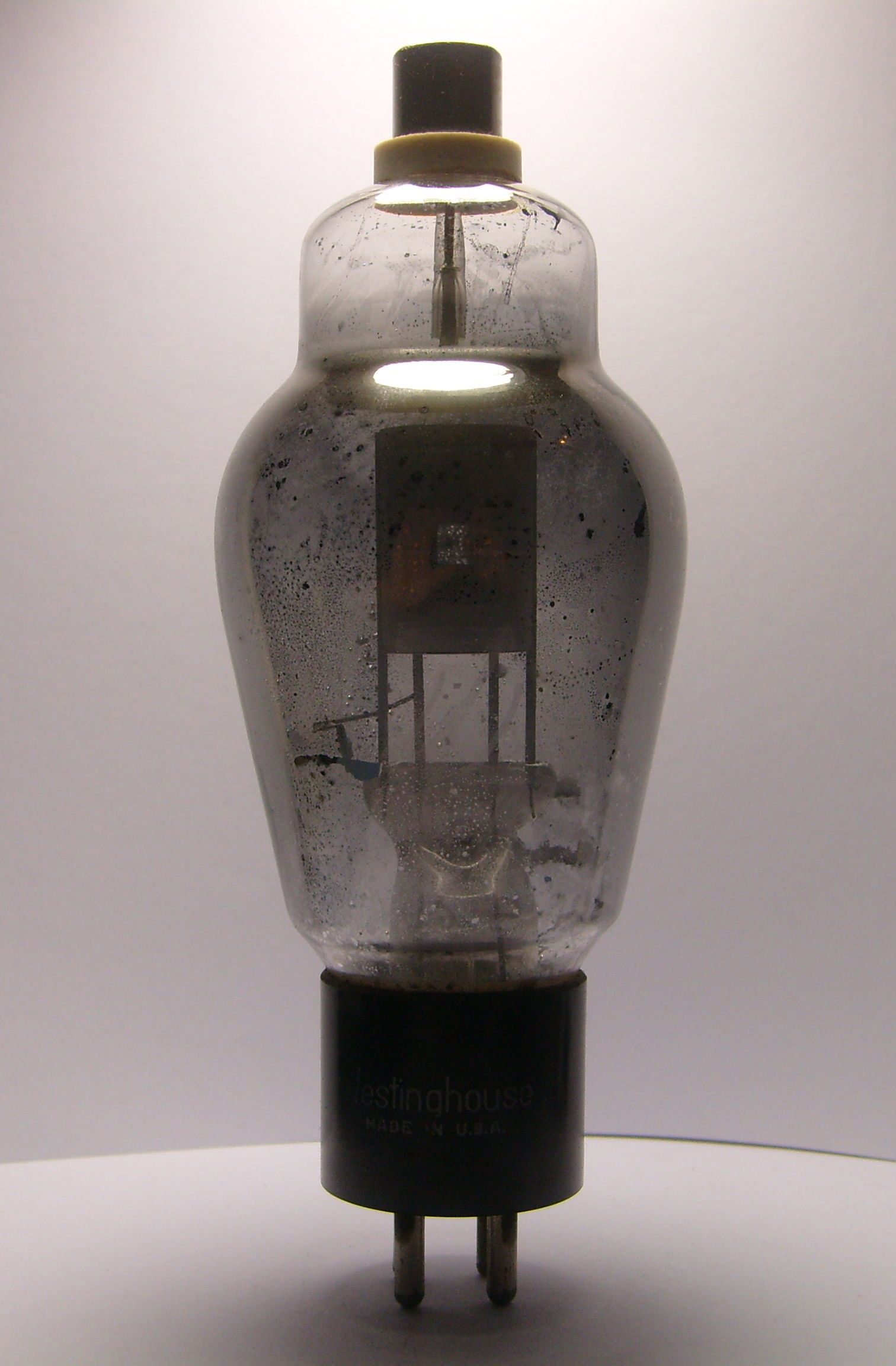
  866A
  – A mercury-vapor rectifier with a peak inverse voltage of 5 kV and peak anode current of 1 ampere. Average anode current, 250 mA, forward drop, 15 volt. Heater voltage and current, 2.5 at 5 A. American 4-Pin(UX) base.

- 866A – Improved 866 with a peak inverse voltage of 10 kV and a forward drop of 10 volt.

- 872 – A mercury-vapor rectifier with a peak inverse voltage of 5 kV and peak anode current of 5 amperes. Average anode current, 1250 mA, forward drop, 15 volt. Heater voltage, 5.0 at 10 A. Base fits R.C.A. UT-541A Socket.

- 872A – Improved 872 with a peak inverse voltage of 10 kV, a forward drop of 10 volt and a heater current of 6.25 A.

- 879 – A high vacuum rectifier with a peak inverse voltage of ca. 15 kV and peak anode current of ca. 5 mA. 2.5 volt heater and American 4-Pin, (UX) base. Used as half wave rectifier for high voltage cathode ray tube supplies. Similar to type 2X2.
- 884 – An indirectly heated triode thyratron. 6.3 volt heater/filament, Octal base. Electrically similar to type 885. Once commonly used as a sawtooth horizontal sweep waveform generator in recurrent-sweep oscilloscopes. Marketed by DuMont under the type number 6Q5.
- 885 – An indirectly heated triode thyratron. 2.5 volt heater/filament, American 5-Pin (UY) base. Otherwise similar to type 884.
- 898 – Large water-cooled triode for broadcast/industrial applications. Updated version of 862, with 3-phase filament structure.

=== 9 ===
==== 900s ====
- 934 – Vacuum Phototube, spectral S4 response (maximum sensitivity at 400±50 nm), 3-pin Small-Shell Peewee base
- 935 – Vacuum Phototube, spectral S5 response (maximum sensitivity at 340±50 nm), 4-pin octal base
- 950 – Power pentode with directly heated cathode, used in storage battery home radios with 2.0 volt filament supply. Similar to types 1F4 and 1J5G
- 951 – Sharp-cutoff pentode with directly heated cathode, used in storage battery home radios with 2.0 volt filament supply. Similar to type 1B4P
- 953 – Acorn-type UHF diode; 6.3 V heater
- 954 (4672/E1F) – Indirectly heated Acorn-type sharp-cutoff pentode giving gains of 2...3 up to 300 MHz operating in Class-A and usable up to 600 MHz with careful stage design; 6.3 V heater
- 955 (4671/E1C) – Indirectly heated Acorn-type triode giving a power of 135 mW up to 600 MHz operating in Class-A and 500 mW in Class-C with careful stage design; 6.3 V heater
- 956 (4695/E2F) – Indirectly heated Acorn-type remote-cutoff pentode giving gains of 3...4 up to 600 MHz operating in Class-A with careful stage design; 6.3 V heater
- 957 (D1C) – Directly heated Acorn-type UHF receiving triode; 1.25 V filament for portable equipment
- 958 (D2C) – Directly heated Acorn-type UHF transmitting triode with dual, paralleled 1.25 V filaments for increased emission, for portable equipment

- 958A – 958 with tightened emission specs

- 959 (D3F) – Directly heated Acorn-type sharp-cutoff UHF pentode; 1.25 V filament for portable equipment
- 991 – 60-Volts Voltage reference, T4 1/2 lightbulb with 2-contact, bayonet candelabra mount

==== 9000s ====
- 9001 – 954 with a miniature 7-pin base
- 9002 – 955 with a miniature 7-pin base
- 9003 – 956 with a miniature 7-pin base
- 9004 – Acorn UHF diode
- 9005 – Acorn UHF diode with a 3.6 V heater
- 9006 – Detector diode with a miniature 7-pin base

== List of other letter tubes ==
=== A ===
Edison and Swan Electric Light Company (British Mazda/EdiSwan):

- A40 – Acorn UHF triode up to 600 MHz, 4 Volts heater
- A41 – Acorn UHF pentode up to 600 MHz, 4 Volts heater

==== AC*/ ====
Mazda/EdiSwan 4-volts AC, indirectly heated receiver tubes:

- AC/HL – AF triode, British 5-pin base
- AC/HLDD – Dual diode and AF triode, British 7-pin base; similar to MHD4, TDD4
- AC/ME – Tuning indicator, British 7-pin base
- AC/P, AC/P1 – AF triode, British 5-pin base
- AC/P4 – CRT electrostatic-deflection output power triode, British 5-pin base
- AC/PEN – AF power pentode, British 7-pin base
- AC/S2PEN – RF pentode, British 7-pin base
- AC/SP1 – RF pentode for use in squelch circuits or, as the reactance tube, in AFC circuits, British 7-pin base
- AC/SP3 – RF pentode for shortwave and TV receivers, British 7-pin base
- AC/SP3/RH – Low-noise, low-microphonics RF pentode for shortwave and TV receivers, British 7-pin base
- AC/TH1 – Triode/hexode oscillator/mixer, British 9-pin base
- AC/TP = TP4 – Triode/pentode oscillator/mixer, British 7-pin base
- AC/VP1, AC/VP2 – RF pentode, British 7-pin base
- AC2/HL – High-mu triode
- AC2/PEN – AF Power pentode
- AC2/PEN.DD – Dual diode and AF Power pentode
- AC4/PEN – AF Beam power pentode
- AC5/PEN – AF Beam power pentode
- AC5/PEN.DD – Dual diode and AF Beam power pentode
- AC6/PEN – Beam power pentode for use as a magnetic horizontal-deflection output amplifier

==== ACT ====
Marconi-Osram Valve Company

- ACT9 – 800 W Air cooled transmitting triode up to 15 MHz, with derating up to 80 MHz

=== B ===
==== BA ====
Industrial Electronic Engineers:

- BA-0000-P31 – Nimo tube, cathode-ray 1-digit numeric display tube, 10 stenciled electron guns aiming at a P31-phosphor (yellowish-green, medium-persistence) fluorescent screen, top-viewing, Futura Medium font, 2.5 kV anode voltage, 12-pin base

==== BG ====
Burroughs Neon-filled planar glow-transfer plasma bar graph displays:

- BG08220-K – 120-Segment circular with five cathode strings plus a Reset cathode, 1-in-5 major/minor graduation, for use e.g. in direction-finding equipment
- BG12201 = Dale PBG12201 – Dual 201-segment linear with three cathode strings plus a Reset cathode, for use in VU meters etc.
- BG12203 = PBG12203 – Dual 203-segment linear bidirectional with three cathode strings plus two Reset cathodes
- BG12205 = PBG12205 – Dual 201-segment linear with five cathode strings plus a Reset cathode, for use in VU meters etc.
- BG16101 = PBG16101 – Dual 101-segment linear with three cathode strings plus a Reset cathode, for use in VU meters etc.; cf. ИН-33

==== BT ====
British Thomson-Houston (General Electric subsidiary):

- BT1 – Thyratron used in Wynn-Williams' binary prescaler for the alpha particle counter that Rutherford, Chadwick et al. used for their nuclear research at the Cavendish Laboratory in the 1930s

=== C ===
==== CH ====
Tung-Sol:

- CH1027 – Curristor – Four types of nitrogen-filled, radioactive constant-current tubes with a current plateau from 25 to 500 V, all-glass wire-ended, active material is ^{226}Ra with a half-life of 1601 years, for linear capacitor charging and draining in missile and ordnance mine timing circuits, instrumentation biasing, as current reference, etc.:

- CH1027-9 – 10^{−9} A, 18.75 μCi (694 kBq)
- CH1027-10 – 10^{−10} A, 1.875 μCi (69.4 kBq)
- CH1027-11 – 10^{−11} A, 187.5 nCi (6.94 kBq)
- CH1027-12 – 10^{−12} A, 18.75 nCi (694 Bq)

==== CK ====
Raytheon:

CK1414 EBCDIC target
H	I	?	.	¤	[	<	⊞
+	A	B	C	D	E	F	G
Q	R	!	$	*	]	;	△
-	J	K	L	M	N	O	P
Y	Z	=	,	%	≶	'	⊠
	/	S	T	U	V	W	X
8	9	0	#	@	:	>	■
	1	2	3	4	5	6	7

- CK1022 – 1 kV/5...55 μA Corona voltage reference, miniature 7-pin base with anode top cap
- CK1037 = 6437 – 700 V/5...125 μA Corona voltage reference, 3-pin all-glass wire-ended
- CK1038 – 900 V/5...55 μA Corona voltage reference, 3-pin all-glass wire-ended
- CK1039 = 6438 – 1.2 kV/5...125 μA Corona voltage reference, 3-pin all-glass wire-ended
- CK1366, CK1367, CK1368, CK1369 – CRTs with an unphosphored front glass but with fine wires embedded in it for use as electrostatic print heads; the wires would pass the electron beam current through the glass onto a sheet of paper where the desired content was therefore deposited as an electrical charge pattern. The paper was then passed near a pool of liquid ink with the opposite charge. The charged areas of the paper attract the ink and thus form the image.
- CK1383 – Dual-electron gun recording storage tube, a realtime polar, radar PPI-to-rectangular, TV-type analog video transcoder similar to the 7702, with simultaneous R/W, and storing capability. This was achieved by a CRT/camera tube combination; the CRT part writes the PPI-format image onto a thin, dielectric target; the camera part reads the generated charge pattern in TV format from the back side of this target.
- CK1414 – Symbolray character generator monoscope for text mode video rendering in early computer monitors, with a square target having letters, digits and symbols patterned on it in a customer-supplied 8x8 or 8x12 array. An electron beam selects and scans a character, both by appropriate electrostatic deflection, and generates an analog video signal; cf. 4560, TH9503

==== CL ====
Ferranti:

- CL40 and CL41 – Indirectly heated, linear light source (glow modulator tube), mercury/argon-filled gas diode with primer electrode, Octal base, for rotating-drum FAX receivers, film soundtrack recording, etc.
- CL42 and CL43 – Indirectly heated, low-noise linear light source, helium-filled gas diode with primer electrode, Octal base, for film soundtrack recording, interferometers, etc.
- CL44 – Indirectly heated, low-noise linear light source, neon-filled gas diode with primer electrode, Octal base
- CL50 and CL52 – Indirectly heated, linear light source, gas-filled diode with primer electrode, Miniature 7-pin base, for rotating-drum FAX receivers, film soundtrack recording, etc.
- CL55 – Indirectly heated, spectrally pure light source, helium-filled gas diode with primer electrode, Miniature 7-pin base with anode top cap
- CL56 – Indirectly heated, spectrally pure light source, krypton-filled gas diode with primer electrode, Miniature 7-pin base with anode top cap
- CL57 – Indirectly heated, spectrally pure light source, neon-filled gas diode with primer electrode, Miniature 7-pin base with anode top cap
- CL58 – Indirectly heated, spectrally pure light source, xenon-filled gas diode with primer electrode, Miniature 7-pin base with anode top cap
- CL60 – Indirectly heated triode flood beam CRT-type stroboscope lamp with a green A-type phosphor with <1 μs decay time and 10 kCd light output, 20 kV anode voltage, 7-pin duodecal base
- CL61 – CL60 with a blue P-type phosphor with 5 μs decay time and 16 kCd light output
- CL62 – CL60 with an UV Q-type phosphor with 100 ns decay time and 240 Cd light output
- CL63 – CL60 with a yellow-green C-type phosphor with 6 μs decay time and 24 kCd light output
- CL64 – CL60 with a yellow V-type phosphor with 5 μs decay time and 12 kCd light output
- CL65 – CL60 with a red R-type phosphor with 2 μs decay time and 14 kCd light output
- CL66 – CL60 with a white T-type phosphor with 5 μs decay time and 12 kCd light output

=== D ===
Philips:

- D1 – Early directly heated triode used in 1920s TRF and regenerative radios

==== DDR ====
Mullard:

- DDR100 – 100 g max., 250 Hz max., 1-axis accelerometer dual diode with elastically supported anodes, 6.3V/600mA indirect heater, f_{res} = 1 kHz, B8G base

==== DZ ====
Cerberus:

- DZ10 – 3 kHz max. Decade Counter/Selector Dekatron, 14-pin diheptal base

=== E ===
==== EN ====
Ferranti:

- EN10 – Neostron, 400 A_{pk} Gas-filled, cold-cathode tetrode thyratron, differential trigger electrodes, Octal base, for use as a relay or as a reddish 700 Cd stroboscope lamp
- EN15 – 80 A_{avg} Neon-filled, cold-cathode tetrode thyratron, differential trigger electrodes, Noval base, for use as a stroboscope lamp
- EN30 – 250 A_{pk} Gas-filled, arc-discharge cold-cathode tetrode thyratron, differential trigger electrodes, miniature 7-pin base with anode cap, for use as a relay or as a stroboscope lamp
- EN40 – 250 A_{pk} Gas-filled, cold-cathode tetrode thyratron, differential trigger electrodes, Octal base, for use as a whitish stroboscope lamp with a high actinism for photographic film
- EN55 (Single), EDN10 (dual) – Xenon-filled, arc-discharge cold-cathode tetrode thyratron, external (capacitive) trigger, 12-pin base, for use as a white 140 kCd stroboscope lamp
- EN60 – Gas-filled, arc-discharge cold-cathode tetrode thyratron, external (capacitive) trigger, Edison screw lamp base with anode cap, for use as a white 900 klm@10μF@800V stroboscope lamp

=== G ===
Standard Telephones and Cables/Brimar:

- G10/241E – Nomotron, a unidirectional Dekatron with multi-alloy cathodes

Cerberus:

- G11 – 5 mA Gas-filled, cold-cathode switching diode e.g. for relaxation oscillators, 2-pin all-glass wire-ended
- G42 – 35 mA_{peak} Gas-filled switching diode e.g. for relaxation oscillators, 2-pin all-glass wire-ended

==== GE ====
Ferranti:

- GE10 – Directly heated saturated-emission diode. Acts as a heating current-controlled, variable series resistor in voltage/current stabilizer circuits. It has two shorted pins that can be used to disable the circuit if the tube is removed from its socket

==== GK ====
Cerberus:

- GK11 – Touch button tube, an illuminated capacitance touch switch; a cold-cathode DC relay tube, external (capacitive) starter activated by touching; then the cathode glow is visible as an orange ring. 2-pin all-glass wire-ended

==== GN ====
Ferranti:

- GN10 – 250 Amps pulse-current, cold-cathode tetrode thyratron. Octal base

==== GR ====
Cerberus:

- GR15 – 15 mA Gas-filled cold-cathode DC tetrode, one starter and one electrical primer and tritium-primed (half-life: 12.32 years), noval base, for voltage triggers, RC timers etc.
- GR16 – 20 mA Gas-filled, cold-cathode, tritium-primed AC/DC triode, one starter and an EM shield, noval base, for voltage triggers, RC timers etc.
- GR17 – 15 mA Gas-filled cold-cathode AC triode, one starter and an EM shield, noval base, for voltage triggers, RC timers etc.
- GR31 – 15 mA Gas-filled cold-cathode DC tetrode, one starter and one electrical primer plus a tritium primer, noval base
- GR44 – 12 mA Subminiature gas-filled cold-cathode DC pentode, two starters and one primer electrode plus a tritium primer, 5-pin all-glass wire-ended
- GR46 – 12 mA Subminiature gas-filled cold-cathode DC tetrode, one starter and one primer electrode, 4-pin all-glass wire-ended

==== GRD ====
Ferranti:

- GRD7 – Educational, directly heated saturated-emission guard ring diode

=== K ===
==== KN ====
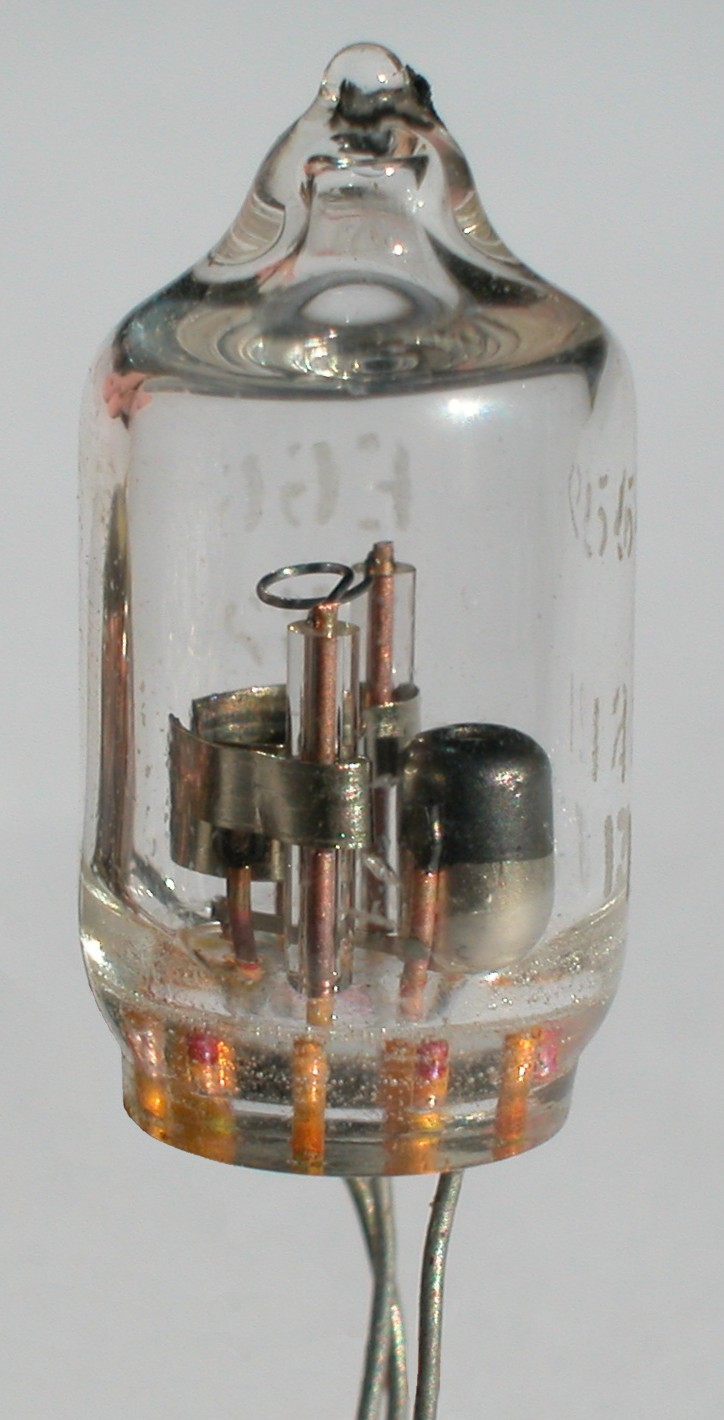
KN2

Edgerton, Germeshausen, and Grier:

- KN2 – 4 kV, 500 A_{surge} Krytron, a cold-cathode gas-filled tube with a primer electrode, for use as a very high-speed, high-surge current switch; similar to a thyratron, lifespan 10^{7} shots, 4-pin all-glass wire-ended
- KN4 – 5 kV, 2.5 kA_{surge} Krytron with a primer electrode, lifespan 25000 shots, 4-pin all-glass wire-ended
- KN6 – 5 kV, 3 kA_{surge} Krytron with a primer electrode, lifespan 35000 shots, 4-pin all-glass wire-ended

- KN6B – 8 kV, 3 kA_{surge} Krytron with a primer electrode, lifespan 35000 shots, 4-pin all-glass wire-ended

- KN9 – 4 kV, 500 A_{surge} Krytron with a primer electrode, lifespan 1.5×10^{7} shots, 4-pin all-glass wire-ended
- KN11B – 2.5 kV, 1.5 kA_{surge} Sprytron, lifespan 2000 shots, 3-pin all-glass wire-ended
- KN12 – 5 kV, 3 kA_{surge} Sprytron, lifespan 500 shots, 3-pin all-glass wire-ended
- KN22 – 5 kV, 100 A_{surge} Krytron with a primer electrode, lifespan 2×10^{7} shots, 4-pin all-glass wire-ended, for laser pumping, to drive Pockels cells, also for educational purposes
- KN26 – 5 kV, 3 kA_{surge} Krytron with a primer electrode, lifespan 75000 shots, 4-pin all-glass wire-ended

==== KT ====
"Tung-Sol":

- KT90
- KT120 – New production tube
- KT150 – New production tube
- KT170 – New production tube

=== M ===
==== MC ====
Philips:

- MC6-16, MC13-16 – CRT-type flying-spot scanners, P16-type phosphor (violet/near-ultraviolet, very short persistence), for use in a telecine

==== ME ====
Edison and Swan Electric Light Company (British Mazda/EdiSwan):

- ME91 – AC/DC mains tuning indicator

=== P ===
==== PD ====
Edison and Swan Electric Light Company (British Mazda/EdiSwan):

- PD220 – Dual AF power triode for battery-supplied equipment (1939)

==== PL ====
Philips:

- PL21 = 2D21 = EN91 – 100 mA_{avg}, 500 mA_{peak}, 10 A_{surge}, Gas-filled, indirectly heated tetrode thyratron, negative starter voltage, miniature 7-pin base, for relay and grid-controlled rectifier service
- PL323 = 3C23 – 1.5 A_{avg}, 6 A_{peak}, Mercury-vapor triode thyratron, 4-pin base with anode top cap
- PL5727 = 5727 – 100 mA_{avg}, 500 mA_{peak}, 10 A_{surge}, Tetrode thyratron, 7-pin miniature base

=== Q ===
Philips:

- Q13-110GU – CRT-type flying-spot scanner, white phosphor, for use in a telecine

==== QK ====
Raytheon:

- QK329 – Beam-deflection square-law tube for use as a function generator in analog computers. A flat sheet beam is electrostatically deflected across the anode which is partially covered by a parabolically stenciled screen "grid" that acts as the tube's output. Two tubes may be combined to form a 1-quadrant analog multiplier using the equation a×b = ((a+b)^{2} − (a−b)^{2})/4 where the deflection electrode signals a+b and a−b can be obtained directly from a fully balanced resistor bridge

=== R ===
Marconi-Osram Valve Company:

- R – Early directly heated triode derived from the French TM tube and used by many amateurs in the 1920s

==== RK ====
Raytheon:

- RK61 – Miniature, gas-filled, directly heated thyratron designed specifically to operate like a vacuum triode below its ignition voltage, allowing it to both amplify analog signals and work as a relaxation oscillator, for use as a self-quenching superregenreative detector up to 100 MHz in radio control receivers, activating a relay in its anode circuit when a carrier wave is received; 4-pin all-glass wire-ended, 1.4 V, 45 mA filament, U_{a}=45 V, I_{a}=1.5 mA.
- RK62 – RK61's predecessor, marketed since 1938; this was the major technical development which led to the wartime development of radio-controlled weapons and the parallel development of radio controlled modelling as a hobby.

=== S ===
==== SB ====
Radio Corporation of America:

- SB256 – 256-bit Selectron tube, an early form of digital computer memory

==== SU ====
Cossor:

- SU25 – EHT rectifier
- SU2150 (CV1120) – High-voltage vacuum half-wave rectifier for use in CRT power supplies

=== T ===
British General Electric Company:

- TuneOn – Early neon-filled bar graph tuning indicator, a glass tube with a short wire anode and a long wire cathode that glows partially; the glow length is proportional to the tube current
- TuneOn Button – Early glow modulator used as a budget-priced tuning indicator – a neon lamp whose brightness is proportional to the tube current

Standard Telephones and Cables/Brimar:

- Tunograph – Precursor of the "Magic Eye" tuning indicator first introduced in 1933; a tiny CRT with 1-axis electrostatic deflection and a phosphored target at 45° to the electron beam, so the projected green dot can be observed from the side

==== TH ====
Compagnie Française Thomson-Houston:

- TH9503 – Scripticon, a character generator monoscope for text mode video rendering in early computer monitors, with a square target having letters, digits and symbols patterned on it in an (optionally customer-supplied) 8x8 array. An electron beam selects and scans a character, both by appropriate magnetic deflection, and generates an analog video signal; cf. 4560, CK1414

==== TM ====
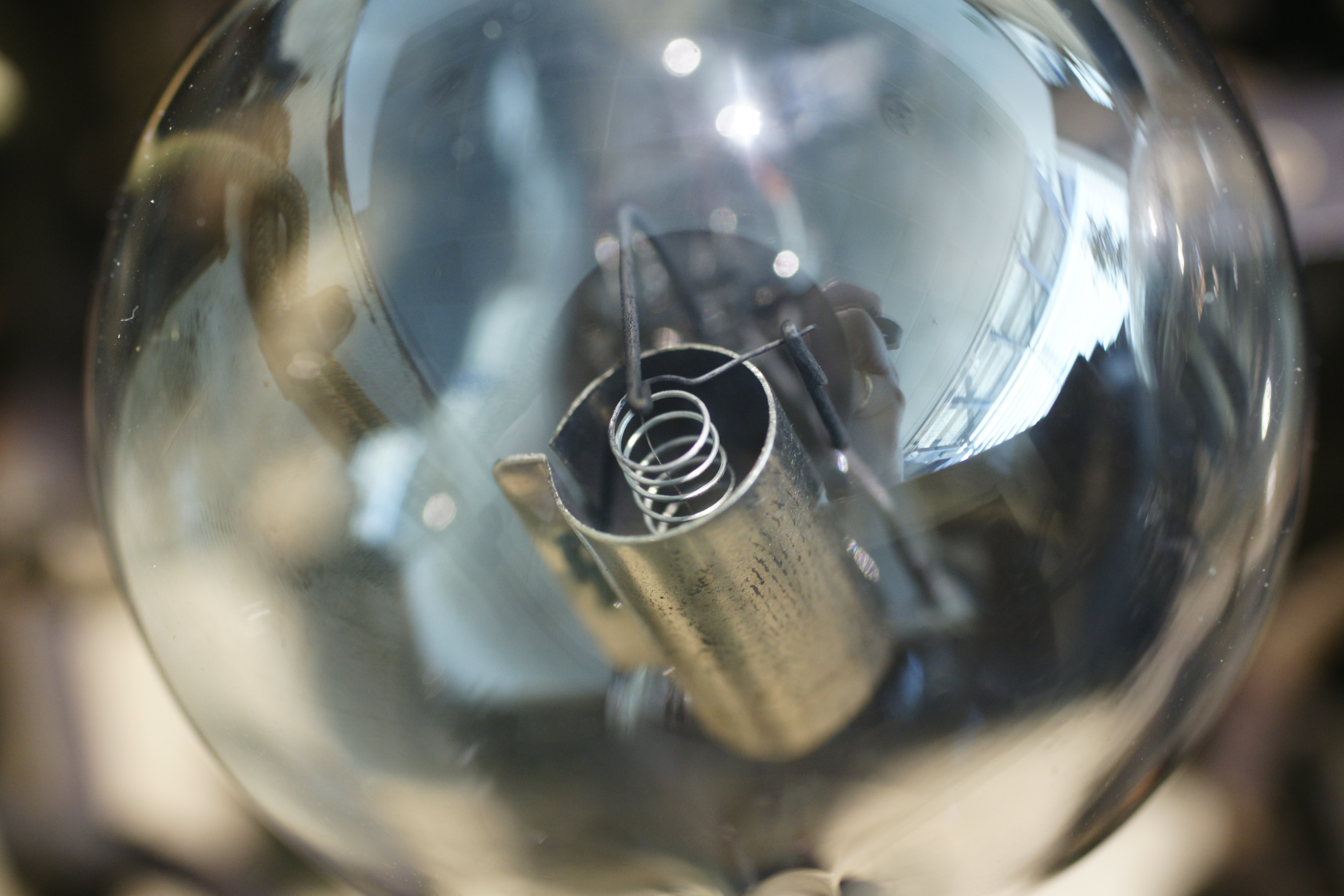
"Loupiote" – a TM tube

E.C.&A. Grammont and Compagnie des Lampes (1888):

- TM – Vacuum triode for amplification and detection of radio signals, developed by the French military telecommunications service Télégraphie Militaire and made since 1915. It became the standard receiving and amplifying tube of the Entente countries during World War I, and the first mass-produced radio tube. TM's production volume in France alone is estimated at 1.1 million units; in addition, the production of TM and/or improved versions was started in the UK (Marconi–Osram R tube), the Netherlands (Philips E tube), the United States, the Soviet Union (R-5 tube, Russian: Р-5)^{(ru)} and Japan (UF-101 tube).
  The TM is a cylindrical/coaxial triode; the directly-heated cathode is a filament made of pure tungsten with a diameter of 60 μm, the anode is a nickel cylinder with a diameter of 10 mm and a length of 15 mm. The dimensions and material of the grid depend on the place of production – the Grammont plant in Lyon used molybdenum wire, the CdL plant in Ivry-sur-Seine used nickel. The diameter of the grid spiral is 4 resp. 4.5 mm. The filament required 4 V and 700 mA to bring it up to white heat; the bright glow prompted Grammont in 1923 to start producing TM tubes with dark blue glass envelopes to protect the eyes of radio operators from the blinding glare, and hide the harmless, but unsightly plaque of metal particles inevitably deposited on the inner wall of the bulb while evacuating during production – but also prevented the triodes' previous, secondary use as light sources, which had earned them their nickname Loupiote ("little lamp").
  The TM could be used for their intended purpose, amplifying and detecting signals in radio receivers, or as power oscillators in low-power radio transmitters, and also, by paralleling of several tubes, as AF power amplifiers. The Soviet analogue of the TM, the triode R-5, could withstand anode voltages of up to 500...800 V, and was able to deliver a power of up to 1 W in Class-C mode, but only 40 mW in Class-A mode. A typical single-TM radio receiver of World War I ran at U_{a}=40 V, U_{g}=0 V, I_{a}≈2 mA, g_{m}=400 μS, R_{i}=25 kΩ, μ=10. With an anode voltage of 160 V and a grid bias of -2 V, the anode current was 3...6 mA, while the reverse grid current reached 1 μA.
  The problem of TM tubes was their short service life of 100 hours maximum – if the tube was manufactured in strict accordance with the specifications. In wartime, this was not always possible; due to raw materials supply problems, plants sometimes had to use substandard materials. Such tubes were marked with a cross; they differed from the standard by a higher noise level and were prone to catastrophic failures due to cracks in the glass envelope.

==== TT ====
Bendix:

- TT8, TT9, TT13, TT15, TT17, TT18, TT20, TT21, TT22 – Chronotron, integrating, balanced-bridge hot-wire/PTC time delay devices

Marconi-Osram Valve Company:

- TT11 – Low power VHF transmitting beam tetrode
- TT21 – RF power beam-tetrode derived from KT88
- TT100 – RF power beam-tetrode

=== V ===
==== VHT ====
Ferranti:

- VHT1 – Pentagrid converter, 1933

=== Lettered Loctal tubes used in Philco radios ===
- FM1000 – Unusual pentagrid for use as oscillator and coincidence-type phase detector in a PLL FM quadrature detector. The anode signal is loosely coupled into the oscillator tank and pulls it to stay quadrature-phase-locked with the IF; manufactured by Sylvania and used in Philco AM/FM radios of the late 1940s and early 1950s. Predecessor of the nonode approach
- XXB – Medium-mu twin triode, also numbered 3C6/XXB
- XXD – Medium-mu twin triode, also numbered 14AF7/XXD
- XXFM – High-mu triode, twin diode (one shares its cathode with the triode, one with separate cathode), also numbered 7X7/XXFM
- XXL – Medium-mu triode, also numbered 7A4/XXL

== List of tubes used in 1920s and 1930s radio receivers ==
=== Directly heated ===
Used with AC, DC or home-based storage battery power supplies (1927–31)

==== 1.1 Volt DC filament ====
Used in 1920s home radios. Filaments powered by 1.5 volt dry cells, anodes powered by storage batteries.

- WD-11 – triode/detector

==== 2 Volts DC filament ====
Used in 1930s home radios powered by storage batteries.

- 19 – Dual power triode – also used in farm radios with 6-volt vibrator power supplies. Early version of octal type 1J6G.
- 20 – Power triode – Early versions numbered UX-120.
- 22 – Sharp-cutoff tetrode – Early versions numbered UX-222 or CX-322.
- 25S – Dual detector diode, medium-mu triode. Identical to type 1B5. Usually numbered 1B5/25S.
- 30 – Medium-mu triode, An upgraded version of type 01-A – Early versions numbered RCA-230 or CX-330. Can also be used as a power triode. The type 30 was popular amongst amateurs of the day. Early UX4 based version of octal type 1H4G.
- 31 – Power triode, UX4 based – Early versions numbered RCA-231 or CX-331.
- 32 – Sharp-cutoff tetrode – Early versions numbered RCA-232 or CX-332.
- 33 – Power pentode – Early versions numbered RCA-233 or C-333.
- 34 – Remote-cutoff tetrode – Early versions numbered RCA-234 or CX-334.
- 49 – Dual-grid power triode, similar to type 46

==== 3.3 Volts DC filament ====
Used in 1920s home radios powered by dry cells (filaments) and storage batteries (B-plus voltage).

- V99 – Low-mu triode. Except for stub-pin bayonet base and pinout, electronically similar to X99
- X99 – Similar to V99, but with standard pins and different basing arrangement (pinout).

==== 4 Volts DC filament ====
- 3NF – Tube-based "integrated circuit" with 3 triodes and passive components in the same envelope. 4V heater

==== 5 Volts DC filament ====
Used in 1920s home radios powered by storage batteries.

- 00-A – Detector triode with a trace of argon. "00-A" is the number used in most tube manuals. Numbers for earlier versions include UX-200-A and CX-300-A (long pins, push-in socket) and UV-200-A (stub pins, bayonet socket).
- 01-A – All-purpose low-mu triode, used as RF amplifier, detector, AF amplifier and power triode. The most popular tube of the 1920s. "01-A" is the number used for replacements manufactured after 1930 and in tube manuals. Numbers for early versions include UX-201-A and CX-301-A (long pins, push in socket) and UV-201-A (stub pins, bayonet socket).

Note: There were four tubes in the "01" series, each with different current ratings for their filaments. Type 01-A was the most commonly used.

Types UV 201 and UX 201 – 1.0 ampere
Type 01-A (UV 201-A, UX 201-A, etc.) – 250 milliampere
Type UX 201-B – 125 milliampere
Type UX 201-C – 60 milliampere

- 12-A – Medium-mu triode, often used as detector, audio driver or audio output, but not as an RF amplifier. This type is listed in tube manuals after 1930 for replacements purposes. Also referred to as type 112-A. Many early versions are marked UX-112-A or CX-112-A.
- 40 – Medium-mu triode – Early versions numbered UX-240. Introduced in 1927, this was an upgraded version of the "01" series. The "01" series had an amplification factor of 8, while type 40 had an amplification factor of 30. (By comparison, the two AC triodes introduced in the same time period – types 26 and 27 – had amplification factors of 8.3 and 9, respectively.) Because this was the highest-amplification triode available, advertising literature of the time lists it as a high-mu triode, although it is now classified as a medium-mu triode. Type 40 had the highest amplification factor of any triode until the introduction in 1932 of diode/triode complex type 2A6, which had an amplification factor of 100. It also had the highest amplification factor of any DC filament triode until the introduction in 1939 of complementary diode/triode complex types 1H5GT (octal) and 1LH4 (Loctal), which both had amplification factors of 65.

==== Directly AC-heated power tubes ====
- 10 – Power triode – Early versions numbered UX-210 or CX-310.
- 26 – Medium-mu triode, used in early AC radio receivers manufactured in the late 1920s. Used as an RF or AF amplifier, but not as a detector or power output tube – Early versions numbered UX-226 or CX-326.
- 45 – Power triode – Early versions numbered UX-245 or CX-345.
- 46 – Dual grid power triode – Grids 1 and 2 connected together for use as push-pull Class-B outputs, Grid 2 and anode connected together for use as single-tube audio driver.
- 47 – Power pentode – Early versions numbered RCA-247 or C-347.
- 50 – Power triode – Early versions numbered UX-250 or CX-350.
- 71-A – Power triode – This type listed in tube manuals after 1930 for replacements purposes. Also referred to as 171-A. Many early versions numbered as UX-171-A or CX-371-A.

==== Directly AC-heated rectifier tubes ====
- 80 – Full-wave rectifier used in early power supplies or battery eliminators (electronically similar to 5Y3G) – Early versions numbered UX-280 or CX-380; derived from the 13 (UX-213)
- 81 – Half-wave rectifier – Early versions numbered UX-281 or CX-381; derived from the 16-B (UX-216-B)
- 82 – Full-wave mercury-vapor rectifier
- 83 – Full-wave mercury-vapor rectifier
- 83-V – High-vacuum version of type 83, Early UX4 based version of octal type 5V4G.

=== Indirectly heated ===
==== DC heater ====
- 15 – Sharp-cutoff pentode, used in farm radios, in autodyne circuits requiring a separate cathode.

==== 2.5 Volts heater ====
Powered by an AC transformer

- 24 – Sharp-cutoff tetrode, UX5 based, Early versions numbered UY-224 and C-324
- 24-A – an upgraded version of type 24, see type 24 above. Early versions numbered UY-224A and C-324A
- 27 – Medium-mu triode, UX5 based, Early versions numbered UY-227 and C-327. The first North American tube with an indirectly heated cathode, which is necessary for detector circuits in AC powered tube radios.
- 29 – Wunderlich detector. Known to have been manufactured by Sylvania.
- 35 – Remote-cutoff tetrode, UX5 based, (Commonly branded as 35/51). Early versions numbered UY-235 or C-335
- 51 – Similar to 35, see type 35 above. (Commonly branded as 35/51)
- 53 – Dual power triodes, Class-B, UX7 based, (Except for heater, electronically similar to 6A6 and octal based 6N7)
- 55 – Dual diode, medium-mu triode, UX6 based, (Except for heater, electronically similar to type 85, and octal based 6V7G, but not to 75)
- 56 – Medium-mu triode, UX5 based, (Except for heater, electronically similar to 76, and octal based 6P5G)
- 57 – Sharp-cutoff pentode used in cabinet and mantel radio receivers, UX6 based, (Except for heater, electronically similar to 6C6 and octal based 6J7G, and somewhat similar to type 77)
- 58 – Remote-cutoff pentode, UX6 based, (Except for heater, electronically similar to 6D6 and octal based 6U7G, but not to 78)
- 59 – Power pentode, UX7 based.
- 90 – Wunderlich detector
- 95 – Original number of type 2A5

==== 4 Volts heater ====
- 2HF – Tube-based "integrated circuit" with 2 tetrodes and passive components in the same envelope

==== 6.3 Volts heater ====
Powered by an AC transformer or a vehicle crank battery

- 1-V – Half-wave rectifier, UX4 based, (often branded as type 1V/6Z3). Early version was KR-1.
- 36 – Sharp-cutoff tetrode, UX5 based. Early versions numbered RCA-236 or C-336
- 37 – Medium-mu triode, UX5 based. Early versions numbered RCA-237 or C-337
- 38 – Power pentode, UX5 based. Early versions numbered RCA-238
- 39 – Remote-cutoff pentode, UX5 based (Commonly branded as 39/44).
- 41 – Power pentode, Early UX6 based version of octal type 6K6G, and Loctal type 7B5.
- 42 – Power pentode, Early UX6 based version of octal type 6F6G, Except for heater, similar to types 2A5 and 18.
- 44 – Similar to type 39, see type 39 above. (Commonly branded as 39/44).
- 64 – Sharp-cutoff tetrode (Except for 400 milliampere heater, similar to 36)
- 65 – Remote-cutoff pentode (Except for 400 milliampere heater, similar to 39)
- 67 – Medium-mu triode (Except for 400 milliampere heater, similar 37)
- 68 – Power pentode (Except for 400 milliampere heater, similar to 38)
- 69 – Wunderlich detector
- 70 – Wunderlich detector used in Mission Bell model 19 car radio. Listed in early Philco tube lists.
- 75 – Dual diode, high-mu triode. Early UX6 based version of octal types 6B6G & 6SQ7GT, and Loctal type 7B6, and 7-pin miniature type 6AV6. Also except for heater, electronically similar to 2A6.
- 76 – Medium-mu triode, Early UX5 based version of octal type 6P5G.
- 77 – Sharp-cutoff pentode, Early UX6 based version of octal type 6J7G.
- 78 – Remote-cutoff pentode, Early UX6 based version of octal type 6K7G.
- 79 – Dual power triode, Early UX6 based version of octal type 6Y7G.
- 84 – Full-wave rectifier, often branded as type 84/6Z4. Early UX5 based version of octal type 6X5GT, and Loctal 7Y4, and 7-pin miniature 6X4.
- 85 – Dual diode, medium-mu triode. Early UX6 based version of octal type 6V7G, except for heater voltage similar to type 55. Also somewhat similar to octal type 6SR7GT and 7-pin miniature types 6BF6.
- 89 – Power pentode, UX6 based.
- 92 – Wunderlich detector

==== AC/DC series heater ====
- 14 – Similar to 24-A but with a 14 volt, 300 milliampere heater. Used in Philco models 46 and 46E
- 17 – Similar to 27 but with a 14 volt, 300 milliampere heater. Used in Philco models 46 and 46E
- 18 – Similar to 2A5 and 42 but with a 14 volt, 300 milliampere heater. No known commercial use.
- 43 – Power pentode, Early UX6 based version of octal type 25A6G
- 48 – Power tetrode, used in 32-volt farm radios. When two are parallel-connected, they can operate with anode and screen voltages as low as 28 volt.
- WG38 – Tube-based "integrated circuit" with 2 pentodes, a triode and passive components in the same envelope

=== Shielded tubes for Majestic radios ===
In the early 1930s, the Grigsby-Grunow Company – makers of Majestic brand radios – introduced the first American-made tubes to incorporate metal shields. These tubes had metal particles sprayed onto the glass envelope, copying a design common to European tubes of the time. Early types were shielded versions of tube types already in use. (The shield was connected to the cathode.) The Majestic numbers of these tube types, which are usually etched on the tube's base, have a "G" prefix (for Grigsby-Grunow) and an "S" suffix (for shielded). Later types incorporated an extra pin in the base so that the shield could be connected directly to the chassis.

Replacement versions from other manufacturers, such as Sylvania or General Electric, tend to incorporate the less expensive, form-fitting Goat brand shields that are cemented to the glass envelope.

Grigsby-Grunow did not shield rectifier tubes (except for type 6Y5 listed below) or power output tubes.

- Early types based on existing tubes. (Non-shielded versions may be used, but add-on shielding is recommended.)

- G-2A7-S – Pentagrid converter
- G-2B7-S – Semiremote-cutoff pentode, dual detector diode
- G-6A7-S – Pentagrid converter
- G-6B7-S – Semiremote-cutoff pentode, dual detector diode
- G-6F7-S – Remote-cutoff pentode, medium-mu triode
- G-25-S – Medium-mu triode, dual detector diode for 2.0 volt storage battery radios. Glass type 1B5/25S used for replacement.
- G-51-S – Remote-cutoff tetrode
- G-55-S – Medium-mu triode, dual detector diode
- G-56-S – Medium-mu triode
- G-56A-S – Medium-mu triode, original version of type 76, but with 400 milliampere heater. (Not to be confused with types 56 or G-56-S, which has a 2.5 volt, 1.0 ampere heater.)
- G-57-S – Sharp-cutoff pentode
- G-57A-S – Sharp-cutoff pentode, original version of type 6C6, but with 400 milliampere heater. (Not to be confused with types 57 or G-57-S, which has a 2.5 volt, 1.0 ampere heater.)
- G-58-S – Remote-cutoff pentode
- G-58A-S – Remote-cutoff pentode, original version of type 6D6, but with 400 milliampere heater. (Not to be confused with types 58 or G-58-S, which has a 2.5 volt, 1.0 ampere heater.)
- G-85-S – Similar to G-55-S, but with 6.3 volt heater.

- Later types

- 6C7 – Medium-mu triode, dual detector diode, similar to later octal types 6R7 and 6SR7. Seven pin base. (Shield to pin 3.)
- 6D7 – Sharp-cutoff pentode, identical to type 6C6, but with 7-pin base. (Shield to pin 5.)
- 6E7 – Remote-cutoff pentode, identical to type 6D6, but with 7-pin base. (Shield to pin 5.)
- 6Y5 – Dual rectifier diode, similar to type 84/6Z4, but with 6-pin base. (Shield to pin 2.)

- Other tubes unique to Majestic radios

- G-2-S and G-4-S – Dual detector diodes with common cathodes. The first detector diodes packaged in a separate tube. Forerunners of octal type 6H6. Spray-shielded. Both tubes have 2.5 volt heaters. G-2-S is larger and has a 1.75 ampere heater. Type G-4-S has a 1.0 ampere heater. Later Sylvania replacement type 2S/4S has a 1.35 ampere heater.
- 2Z2/G-84 – Half-wave rectifier diode with 2.5 volt indirectly heated cathode. A lower-voltage version of type 81. Not interchangeable with type 6Z4/84.
- 6Z5 – Full-wave rectifier, similar to types 6Z4/84 and 6X5, but with 12.6 volt center-tapped heater.

=== Rarely used tubes ===
- 52 – Dual grid power triode similar to types 46 and 49. Has 6.3 volt filament. Most commonly used in early car radios
- 181 – Power triode
- 182-B – Similar to 482-B below.
- 183 – Similar to 483 below.
- 482-B – Power triode with directly heated cathode. Used in Sparton AC radios, circa 1929. Replacements often numbered 182-B/482-B. Similar to type 71-A, but with higher anode voltage.
- 483 – Power triode with directly heated cathode. Used in Sparton AC radios, circa 1929. Replacements often numbered 183/483. Similar to type 45, but with a 5.0 volt, 1.25 ampere heater.
- 485 – Medium-mu triode with indirectly heated cathode. Used in Sparton AC radios, circa 1929. Similar to types 56 and 76, but with a 3.0 volt, 1.25 ampere heater, and lower anode voltage.

== References and footnotes ==
=== General literature and data sheets ===
- Frank Philipse's Tube Datasheet Archive

- Mirrors in Brazil • Brazil searchable • Germany • Germany • Romania • Romania searchable • Sweden • USA • US • US

- Tubebooks.org datasheet collection
- Roy J. Tellason's tube datasheet collection
- Klausmobile Russian tube directory
- General Electric Essential Characteristics, 1970

- RCA Receiving Tube Manuals R10 (1932) • RC11 (1933) • RC12 (1934) • RC13 (1937) • RC14 (1942) • RC15 (1948) • RC16 (1951) • RC17 (1954) • RC18 (1956) • RC19 (1959) • RC20 (1960) • RC21 (1961) • RC22 (1963) • RC23 (1964) • RC24 (1965) • RC25 (1966) • RC26 (1968) • RC27 (1970) • RC28 (1971) • RC29 (1973) • RC30 (1975)
- Scanned tube documentation (PDFs): Tubebooks • Frank Philipse • 4tubes
- Sylvania Technical Manual, 1958
- J. P. Hawker (ed), Radio and television servicing, Newnes, London, 1964
- • Decoding type numbers
- Decoding Valve, Transistor and CRT Numbers
- European tube designation systems: • •
