= Valve audio amplifier =

Type of valve amplifier

A valve audio amplifier (UK) or vacuum tube audio amplifier (US) is a valve amplifier used for sound reinforcement, sound recording and reproduction.

Until the invention of solid state devices such as the transistor, all electronic amplification was produced by valve (tube) amplifiers. While solid-state devices prevail in most audio amplifiers today, valve audio amplifiers are still used where their audible characteristics are considered pleasing, for example in music performance or music reproduction.

== Instrument and vocal amplification ==
Valve amplifiers for guitars (and to a lesser degree vocals and other applications) have different purposes from those of hi-fi amplifiers. The purpose is not necessarily to reproduce sound as accurately as possible, but rather to fulfill the musician's concept of what the sound should be. For example, distortion is almost universally considered undesirable in hi-fi amplifiers but may be considered a desirable characteristic in performance.

Small signal circuits are often deliberately designed to have very high gain, driving the signal far outside the linear range of the tube circuit, to deliberately generate large amounts of harmonic distortion. The distortion and overdrive characteristics of valves are quite different from transistors (not least the amount of voltage headroom available in a typical circuit) and this results in a distinctive sound. Amplifiers for such performance applications typically retain tone and filter circuits that have largely disappeared from modern hi-fi products. Amplifiers for guitars in particular may also include a number of "effects" functions.

=== Origins of electric guitar amplification ===
The electric guitar originates from Rickenbacker in the 1930s but its modern form was popularised by Fender and Gibson (notably the Fender Telecaster (1951) & Stratocaster (1954) and Gibson Les Paul (1952) during the 1950s. The earliest guitar amplifiers were probably audio amplifiers made for other purposes and pressed into service, but the electric guitar and its amplification quickly developed a life of its own, supported by specialist manufacturers.

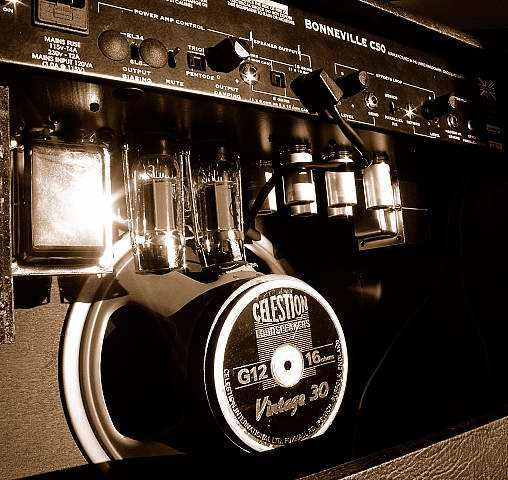
Rear view of a valve combo guitar amplifier. Visible are two glass 6L6 output tubes, six smaller 12AX7 preamp tubes in their metal tube retainers and both the power transformer and the output transformer.

Guitar amplifiers are often designed so they can, when desired by the guitarist, distort and create a tone rich in harmonics and overtones. The characteristics of the tube and the circuit directly influence the nature of the sound produced. Even the power supply can influence the tonal shape, with relatively undersized power supply capacitors producing a characteristic "sag" at instants of peak output and power draw, and subsequent recovery, that is often considered musically engaging. In addition, guitarists may employ acoustic feedback, further modifying the resulting sound (noting that the feedback signal has a slight time lag relative to the original signal).

Guitar amplifiers are typically designed to withstand a lot of abuse both electrically and physically (since guitarists often travel to gigs, etc.) In large systems the amplifier is separate from the speaker enclosure(s), but in smaller systems it is often integrated, forming a so-called "combo". Since the amplifier is usually at the top of the combo, the tubes often hang upside down facing the body of the enclosure. They may be held in with clips.

Most modern valve guitar amplifiers use a class AB1 push-pull circuit with a pair of power pentodes or beam tetrodes, 6L6 or EL34 but occasionally KT88, 6550, or the lower-power EL84 in Ultra-Linear connection. The output stage is preceded by a voltage amplification stage (pentode or twin triode) and a phase-splitter (twin triode). Twin triodes with two identical sections in one envelope are used, usually the noval types 12AT7, 12AU7, or 12AX7 or equivalents, less usually the octal 6SN7.

== Amplifiers for sound reproduction ==
=== Early development ===
The earliest mass usage of valve audio amplifiers was for telephony. Valve amplifiers were critical in development of long-distance telephone circuits and submarine telephone cables. Radio applications followed soon after, where valves were used for both the audio (AF) and radio (RF) circuitry. (RF is outside the scope of this article, see valve amplifier).

Among the first applications of sound recording and electronic replay around the 1920s was its use in many cinemas equipping for exhibiting the new 'talkies'. Cinema sound systems of this period were predominantly supplied by "Westrex", related to the Western Electric company, a telecoms supplier, who were also the makers of the 300B DHT tube that today is central to current production DH-SET audiophile amplification.

Amplifiers during this period typically used Directly Heated tubes in a Class A Single-Ended Triode circuit. Power output ranged from a few watts to perhaps 20 watts for an exceptionally powerful amplifier (modern semiconductor amplifiers produce much higher power). Today this type of circuit retains a niche following at the very extreme of audiophile hi-fi, where it is often referred as DH-SET.

Prior to WWII, almost all electronic amplifiers were triodes used without feedback. The inherent, albeit imperfect, linearity of tubes makes it possible to get acceptable distortion performance without correction. Amplitude distortion in a class A triode stage can be small if care is taken to prevent the anode current from becoming too small and ensuring that grid current does not flow at any point. In this case, distortion is largely relatively unobjectionable second harmonic, with percentage closely proportional to the output amplitude. Adding modest negative feedback improves linearity further. Pentodes of the same power dissipation are capable of higher output power than triodes, but distortion is higher and more objectionable.

=== 1940s and 1950s ===
During the immediate post-war period, high-fidelity valve amplifier design advanced rapidly through improved output transformers and systematic application of negative feedback in the push pull topology. A major milestone was the publication in 1947 of the Williamson amplifier by D. T. N. Williamson in Wireless World. The design employed triode-connected beam tetrodes in push–pull, a wide-band output transformer, and substantial global negative feedback, establishing performance targets such as approximately 0.1% total harmonic distortion at rated output.

Widespread adoption of push pull allowed smaller (and thus cheaper) transformers, combined with more power (typically 10 to 20 watts) to handle peaks. The high fidelity industry was born.

In the United States, Frank H. McIntosh and Gordon J. Gow introduced the “unity-coupled” output stage in 1949. In this arrangement, the output transformer primary was divided so that half of the load impedance appeared in the plate circuits of the output valves and half in their cathode circuits. The transformer was bifilar wound, and the screen grids derived their instantaneous voltage from the complementary plate winding. Contemporary descriptions noted that the output valves therefore operated partly as cathode followers, introducing local inverse feedback within the output stage. The arrangement was reported to reduce output impedance and high-frequency notch distortion associated with leakage inductance in conventional class AB₁ push–pull stages.

Later descriptions and patent disclosures generalized the unity-coupled concept. While the bifilar transformer preserved close AC symmetry between plate and cathode windings, it constrained the DC operating voltages of plate and screen to be similar. An alternative implementation employed a trifilar transformer including a separate, tightly coupled screen winding, preserving the AC characteristics of the distributed load arrangement while allowing independent DC screen supply.

Another influential development was Ultra-Linear operation, in which the screen grids of beam tetrodes were connected to taps on the output transformer primary. Although patented earlier by Alan D. Blumlein, the configuration was popularized in the United States by David Hafler and Herbert I. Keroes beginning in 1951. In this arrangement the screen connection introduced a controlled fraction of plate voltage into the screen circuit, and was described as a form of feedback applied within the output stage. Ultra-Linear operation provided characteristics intermediate between triode and pentode connection, combining improved linearity and reduced output impedance with higher efficiency than triode-connected operation.

During the 1950s, high-fidelity equipment expanded rapidly beyond specialist constructors as a broader consumer market for domestic hi-fi systems emerged. Variants of Williamson, Ultra-Linear, and distributed-loading topologies became common in domestic hi-fi amplifiers. The Dynaco ST-70, introduced in 1959 using an Ultra-Linear output stage, became one of the most widely produced valve hi-fi amplifiers.

=== Tube hi-fi in the 1960s ===
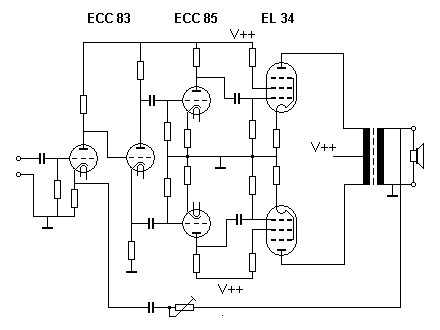
Conceptual diagram of a poweramplifier with a split-load phase inverter and push-pull EL34 pentodes endstage

Valve amplification peaked as the mainstream technology during the 1960s and 70s, with device and circuits being highly developed. There have been only minor refinements since then.

The last generation of power tubes, typified by KT66, EL34 and KT88, represent the pinnacle of the technology and of production quality. Valve amplifiers produced since that time usually use one of these tubes, which have remained in continuous production (apart from KT66) ever since. Output power was typically 20 watts, exceptionally 35W.

Small signal valves overwhelmingly changed from octal base tubes, notably the audio tube of choice, the 6SN7 family, to the smaller and cheaper noval base ECC81, ECC82, ECC83 (UK, in the US known as 12AX7,12AT7, etc.). The lower-power noval base EL84 power pentode was widely used in less expensive 10-watt ultralinear power amplifiers, still of high fidelity.

Commercial tube manufacturers developed designs based on their own products, most notably the Mullard 5-10 circuit. This design and the Williamson were widely implemented and imitated, with or without crediting the originator.

=== Automobile amplifiers ===
Valve radios and amplifiers were used in automobiles until they were displaced by transistorized radios. Transistors had the major advantage of working off the voltage provided by a car battery. Early radios required a power unit to convert the battery voltage to a value high enough for the valves. Later radios used special valves that were designed to operate directly from a 12 volt supply. These later radios were hybrid designs which used transistors only for the audio output stages because a 12 volt power amplifier valve was not practical. For this and other applications, transistors are smaller, cheaper, more durable, use less power, run cooler, and do not need to warm up.

Some enthusiasts prefer "tube amps", so a small number of valve car stereos are still made. Manufacturers include Milbert Amplifiers, Blade, Manley, and Sear Sound. Some are hybrid designs with transistors and valves.

=== Valve preamplifiers ===
Due to the very poor technical performance of early gramophones, the lack of standardised equalisations, poor components and accessories (including loudspeakers), preamplifiers historically contained extensive and very flexible equalization and tone and filter circuits designed to adjust the frequency response of the amplifier and so the sound produced by the system.

Valve preamplifiers use triodes or low-noise pentodes (EF86). Mains hum from the heater filaments is a potential problem in low-level valve stages. Modern amplifiers invariably run from the mains; as there is little need to minimise costs in expensive valve amplifiers, the heater supply is often rectified and even regulated to reduce hum to an absolute minimum.

A representative valve preamp from the 1950s is the Leak 'varislope' series of preamps, which included a switchable rumble filter, a switchable scratch filter with selectable slopes and corner frequency, continuously variable treble and bass tone controls and a selection of 4 different gramophone equalisations (RIAA, ortho, RCA, 78).

=== Valve sound ===
Amplifiers from and prior to this period often have a distinctive sound that today is still widely referred to as "valve sound" and "warm". This tone is not strictly caused by the use of valves rather than transistors; it is merely a sound that was originally associated with amplifiers built using valves simply because that is what was available at the time. The origins of that particular sound are in part due to:

- the typical circuit designs of the time (class A or AB1), combined with
  - simple circuits with relatively little feedback, producing mainly low-harmonic distortion (feedback that could be applied was limited by phase shift in the output transformer);
  - low damping factor (High Z out) output stages;
  - the use of very large amounts of feedback in signal transformerless semiconductor circuits, which leads to distortion that is small but has a much larger proportion of high harmonics than in valve circuits.

Factors relevant to valve equipment not designed to high-fidelity standards:

- dedicated guitar amplifiers had frequency response and distortion suited to their purpose,
- under-dimensioned and unregulated power supplies in amplifiers where power drawn varied significantly with instantaneous power output (class A not affected, classes AB1, AB2, B, increasingly so),
- poor quality output transformers in budget equipment.

== Notable historic designs ==
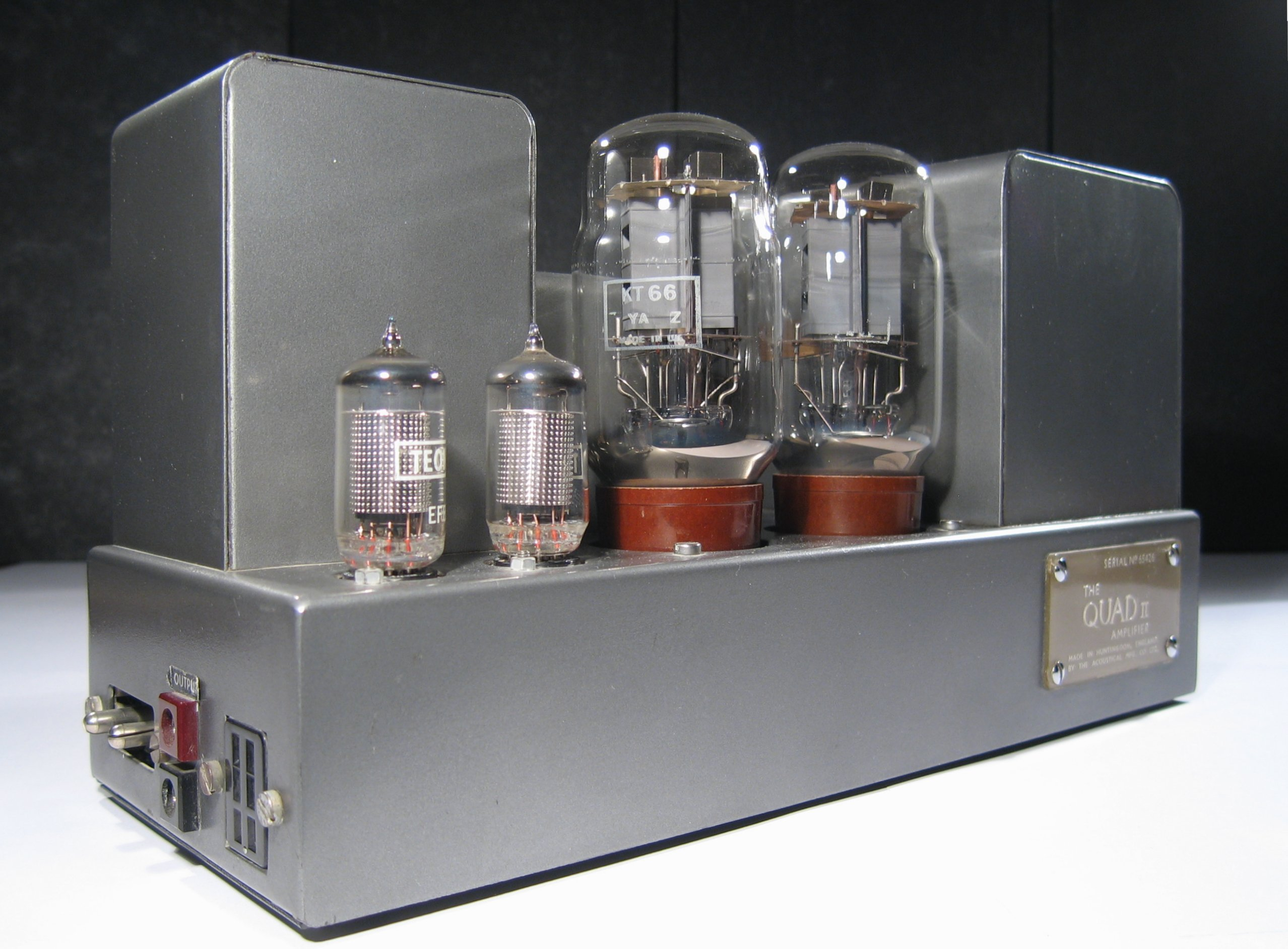
Quad II power amplifier

In addition to a range of commodity valve amplifiers, some amplifiers were made which are still highly regarded today. Among the best known are:

- LEAK TL/12
- Williamson amplifier
- Mullard 5-10
- Quad II
- Dynaco Mark III and Stereo 70
- McIntosh MC275
- Marantz 8B and 9

== Technical information ==
Various basic circuits have been used in designs and in various approaches to construction.

== See also ==
- Amplifier
- Audio amplifier
- Valve sound
- Valve amplifier
