= List of valve amplifier designs =

This is a list of notable valve amplifier designs.

== Leak TL/12 ==
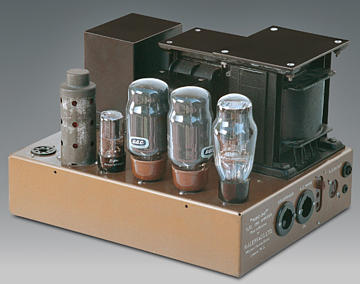
LEAK TL/12 Point One Amplifier

The first commercially produced amplifier with distortion of 0.1% was the LEAK Type 15 "Point One" of 1945, using KT66 vacuum tubes (valves) connected as triodes, with 26 dB feedback over 4 stages including the output transformer. In 1948 LEAK produced the TL/12 which was also rated at 0.1% but featured improved performance with 26 dB over 3 stages and the output transformer (giving better gain-margin and phase-margin). The TL/12 sold in large quantities to professional users, radio stations, laboratories, as well as to the emerging market for hi-fi equipment. It is highly prized even today by audio enthusiasts.

== Williamson ==
The Williamson amplifier was published in 1947 as an article in Wireless World, and was a milestone which defined the mainstream topology for the majority of amplifiers thereafter. The design gave particular attention to a very high specification for the output transformer, in addition to being generally a consistently well worked-through design. It was not itself originally a commercial design, but many commercial versions and derivatives were subsequently made (with and without due credit).

== Mullard 5-10 ==
To promote their new 9-pin tubes EZ80, EF86 and EL84, the Anglo-Dutch Mullard Company developed, in 1954, a famous and very popular mono amplifier circuit, the Mullard 5-10. The design featured 5 tubes with 10 watts output: EF86 as preamplifier, ECC83 phase-splitting, two EL84 in push-pull configuration, EZ80 rectifier. The amplifier used the excellent Partridge output transformer and was well known for its great sound reproduction.

== Dynaco ==
Dynaco was a major US manufacturer of completed and kit amplifiers of high quality, notably of the Mark III and the Stereo 70, claimed to be the most popular tube amp ever made with over 300,000 produced.

== McIntosh MC275 ==
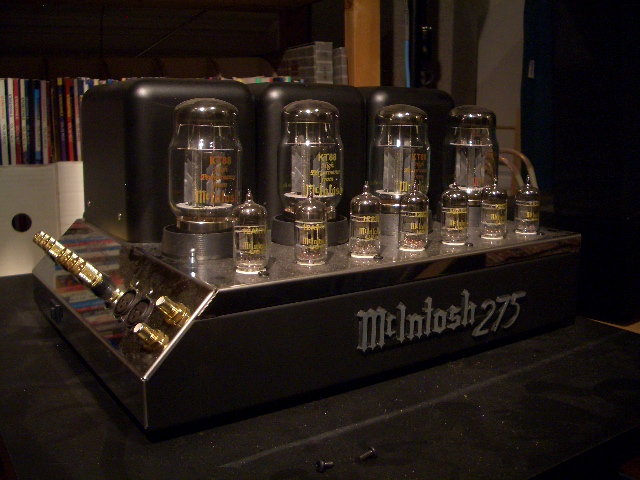
MC275 stereo tube amp, 75W per channel

McIntosh Laboratory long held a reputation for producing very high quality high-end equipment in the US. The model MC275 was produced from May 1961 through July 1973.

The model MC275 perhaps demonstrates most clearly the revival in tube amplifiers, as used MC275s in mint condition can sell for up to eight times their original purchase price, and a "Commemorative Edition" made during the 1990s was priced at $4000.

== Marantz 8B ==
Another historic manufacturer of valve amplifiers was Marantz. The Marantz 8B is another design that has been considered a classic and for which a "Reissue" edition has been produced.
