= Manley Laboratories =

American audio equipment manufacturer

Manley Laboratories, LLC
- Company type: Corporation
- Founded: 1988; 38 years ago in Chino, USA
- Founders: EveAnna Manley, David Manley
- Headquarters: Chino, United States
- Key people: Dirk Ulrich
- Products: Pro audio equipment, Microphones, Signal processors, Dynamic range processors, Equalizers, Converters, Audio mastering products
- Number of employees: 32 (2014)
- Parent: Rockforce Tech Holding Inc.
- Website: manley.com

Manley Laboratories, LLC is an American manufacturer of pro audio and high-end audio equipment located in Chino, California.

The first MANLEY-branded products were introduced in 1989, with Manley Laboratories, Inc. becoming an independent company in 1993. The company's products include microphones, signal processors, dynamic range processors, equalizers, converters, specialized mastering products, tube audio amplifiers, integrated amplifiers, and preamplifiers.

== History ==
Recording and film engineer David Manley began designing high fidelity vacuum tube amplifiers in South Africa in 1980. The earliest units he produced were modified LEAK amplifiers. In 1983, the first Vacuum Tube Logic (VTL) tube power amplifiers and preamplifiers went into full-fledged production in the UK for the European market. David, joined by his son Luke introduced the amplifiers to the US market at the 1986 Consumer Electronics Show, where the positive reception convinced them to expand their distribution to the US. Production was eventually moved to Chino, California as Vacuum Tube Logic of America, Inc. (VTL).

In 1988, VTL established MANLEY as a secondary brand, first producing what was conceived as upper echelon high fidelity vacuum tube power amplifiers and preamplifiers for the high fidelity home audio market. The following year, EveAnna Dauray, on sabbatical from Columbia University, had traveled to California. Armed with a few business contacts from her stepfather Albert J. Dauray, who had been part owner of vacuum tube bass amplifier manufacturer Ampeg from 1967―1971, EveAnna had aspirations of getting a job with a guitar amp manufacturer like Crate or Fender. She ended up contacting David and Luke Manley, who hired her to work on the VTL production line building products. After training a new team of assemblers, EveAnna moved into the quality control department.

The first MANLEY-branded products tailored specifically for professional recording studio use were created, namely the 60 dB Microphone Preamplifier, followed by the Manley Enhanced Pultec Equalizer. These products, along with the Reference Cardioid and Reference Gold microphones, were introduced at the 1990 AES Convention in Los Angeles.

David and EveAnna eventually married. In April 1993, David and Luke Manley decided to part ways, with Luke creating a new company, VTL Amplifiers, Inc., and David and EveAnna establishing Manley Laboratories, Inc. and opening a new factory at 13880 Magnolia Ave. in Chino. EveAnna worked her way through every segment of the company: testing, prototyping, engineering, purchasing, sales, service, and production management. In 1996 David Manley moved to France, leaving EveAnna to run the company. Over the next three years, Manley sales doubled. David and EveAnna divorced, and on June 10, 1999, EveAnna Dauray Manley officially assumed the duties of President, CEO and sole owner of Manley Laboratories, Inc. when David resigned as President and assigned his share of the company to her.

In 2010, the first MANLEY-branded plug-ins, based on the Massive Passive EQ, were released by Universal Audio, with plug-in versions of the company's Variable Mu limiter compressor, VOXBOX channel strip, and Microphone Preamplifier later released.

On July 10, 2025, Manley Laboratories, LLC was acquired by Rockforce Tech Holding Inc., a company founded by Dirk Ulrich, a music producer and mastering engineer, who previously founded Brainworx Audio and Plugin Alliance, both which he sold to Native Instruments in 2021.

== See also ==
- Vacuum tube
- Valve audio amplifier
