= Williamson amplifier =

Valve amplifier designed by David Theodore Nelson Williamson

The Williamson amplifier is a four-stage, push-pull, Class A triode-output valve audio power amplifier designed by David Theodore Nelson Williamson during World War II. The original circuit, published in 1947 and addressed to the worldwide do it yourself community, set the standard of high fidelity sound reproduction and served as a benchmark or reference amplifier design throughout the 1950s. The original circuit was copied by hundreds of thousands amateurs worldwide. It was an absolute favourite on the DIY scene of the 1950s, and in the beginning of the decade also dominated British and North American markets for factory-assembled amplifiers.

The Williamson circuit was based on the 1934 Wireless World Quality Amplifier by Walter Cocking, with an additional error amplifier stage and a global negative feedback loop. Deep feedback, triode-connected KT66 power tetrodes, conservative choice of standing currents, and the use of wide-bandwidth output transformer all contributed to the performance of the Williamson. It had a modest output power rating of 15 Watts (Note: All ratings here and below are per channel. The amplifier was designed well before the advent of stereo, and was never intended for multi-channel sound.) but surpassed all contemporary designs in having very low harmonic distortion and intermodulation, flat frequency response throughout the audible frequency range, and effective damping of loudspeaker resonances. The 0.1% distortion figure of the Williamson amplifier became the criterion for high fidelity performance that remains valid in the 21st century.

The Williamson amplifier was sensitive to selection and matching of passive components and valves, and prone to unwanted oscillations at infrasonic and ultrasonic frequencies. Enclosing four valve stages and an output transformer in a negative feedback loop was a severe test of design, resulting in a very narrow phase margin or, quite often, no margin at all. Attempts to improve stability of the Williamson could not fix this fundamental flaw. For this reason, and due to high costs of required quality components, manufacturers soon abandoned the Williamson circuit in favour of inherently more stable, cheaper and efficient three-stage, ultralinear or pentode-output designs.

== Background ==
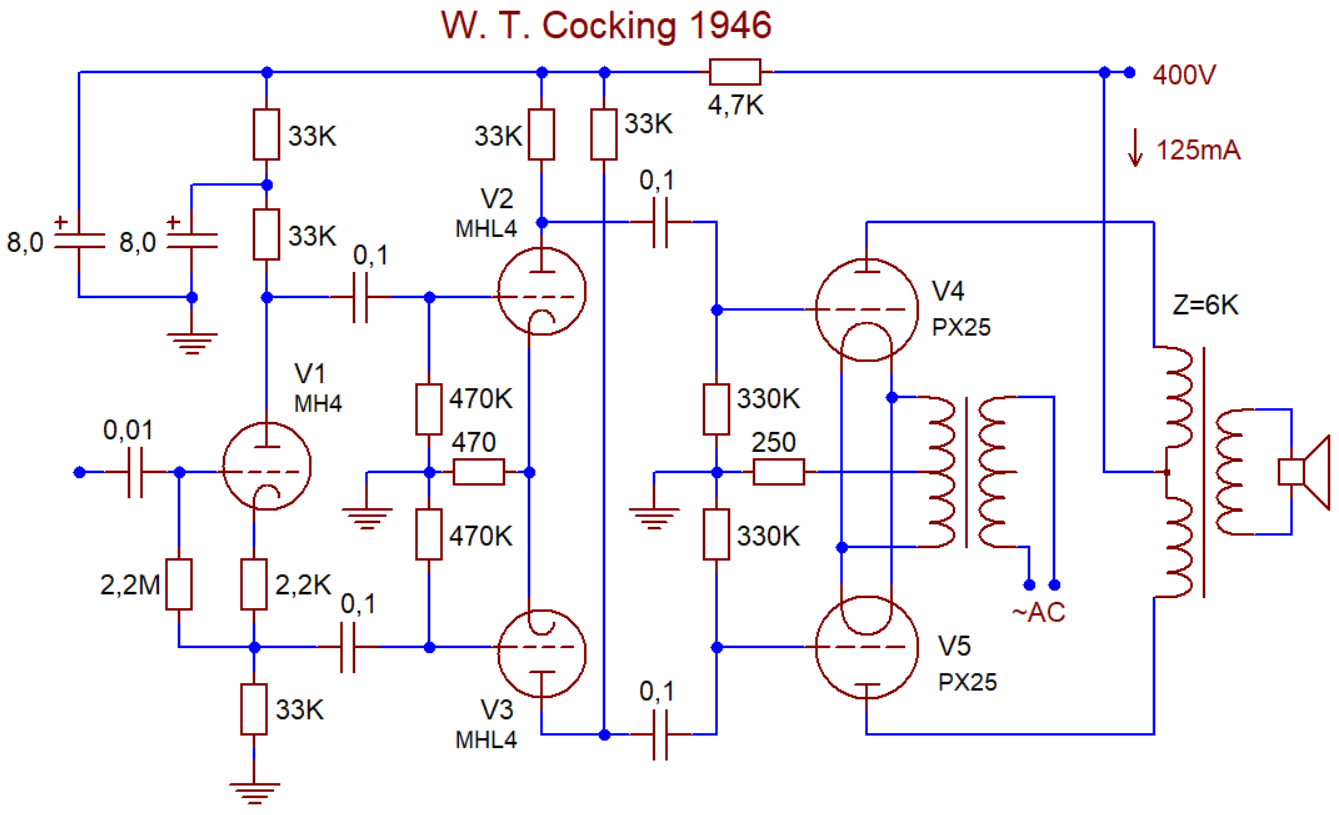
The ultimate version of Cocking's Quality Amplifier, 1946. Absence of cathode bypass capacitors was a "trademark" feature of Williamson's design inherited directly from Cocking's work

In 1925 Edward Kellogg published the first comprehensive theory of audio power amplifier design. Kellogg proposed that the permissible level of harmonic distortion can reach 5%, provided that distortion rises smoothly rather than abruptly, and that it generates only low-order harmonics. Kellogg's work became the de facto industry standard of the interwar period, when most amplifiers were employed in cinemas. Early sound film and public address requirements were low, and customers were content (Note: Introduction of sound film coincided with the Great Depression. Although the entertainment industry fared much better than the society in general, cinema owners had to be very frugal with their investments in equipment.) with crude but efficient and affordable transformer-coupled, class B amplifiers. The best theatre amplifiers, built by Western Electric around their 300A and 300B power triodes, far exceeded the average level but were expensive and rare.

By the middle of the 1930s Western Electric and RCA improved performance of their experimental audio equipment to a level approaching modern understanding of high fidelity, but none of these systems could be commercialized yet. They lacked sound sources of matching quality. Industry leaders of the 1930s agreed that the improvement of commercial amplifiers and loudspeakers would make sense only after the introduction of new physical media surpassing low-quality AM broadcasting and shellac records. The Great Depression, World War II and the post-war television boom (Note: Stinson wrote that the nascent television adversely affected audio electronics even before the war: "these experiments [at EMI, RCA and Western Electric] might have been carried through to products had it not been for the upsurge of interest and publicity for the new marvel, experimental television, from 1934.")consecutively delayed this goal. Development of commercial audio equipment came to a standstill; the few enthusiasts seeking higher level of fidelity had to literally do it themselves. American DIYers experimented with novel beam tetrodes. Australians preferred traditional push-pull circuits built around directly-heated triodes and complex, expensive interstage transformers.

British school of thought led by Walter Cocking (Note: Walter Tusting Cocking (1907–1984) joined the staff of Wireless World in the early 1930s. He was a prolific content contributor, often addressing the how-to side of electronic projects. During World War II Cocking was drafted into classified military research. After the war, he served as the chief editor of Wireless Engineer, Wireless World and their successor magazines until his retirement in 1972.) of Wireless World leaned to push-pull, class A, RC-coupled triode output stages. RC coupling, as opposed to transformer coupling, argued Cocking, extended the amplifier's bandwidth beyond the required minimum of 10 kHz and improved its transient response. Tetrodes and pentodes were undesirable due to higher harmonic distortion and higher output impedance that failed to control fundamental resonance of the loudspeaker. Cocking wrote that Kellogg's 5% distortion limit was too high for quality amplification, and outlined a different set of requirements - the first definition of high fidelity. Instead of Kellogg's single figure of merit (harmonic distortion), Cocking set three simultaneous targets - low frequency distortion, low harmonic distortion, and low phase distortion. In 1934 Cocking published his first Quality Amplifier design - a two-stage, RC-coupled triode class A amplifier that achieved no more than 2–3% maximum distortion without using feedback. Feedback appeared in his 1943 Wartime Quality Amplifier, built around American 6V6 beam tetrodes; however, both the input stage and the output transformer were placed outside the feedback loop. Cocking's Quality Amplifier family became the foundation of post-war British and Australian audio industry, including the Williamson amplifier.

== Development ==
In 1943, in the middle of World War II, twenty-year-old Scotsman Theo Williamson failed mathematics exam and was discharged from the University of Edinburgh. Theo was not physically fit for military service, so instead the authorities drafted him for mandatory civilian work at Marconi-Osram Valve. In April 1944 Williamson transferred from production line to Applications Laboratory of the company, where he had enough free time for his own DIY projects. Management did not object, and by the end of 1944 Williamson had conceived, built and tested the amplifier that would soon be known as the Williamson amplifier. Another wartime projects, a novel magnetic cartridge, would be commercialized in 1948 as the Ferranti ribbon pickup.

=== Design targets ===
Following Cocking's ideas, Williamson devised a different, much stricter set of fidelity requirements:

1. Negligible non-linear distortion (sum of harmonic distortion and intermodulation products) up to the maximum rated output, at all audible frequencies from 10 to 20000 Hz;
2. Linear frequency response and constant output power at all audible frequencies;
3. Negligible phase shift within the audible frequency range;
4. Good transient response which, in addition to above frequency and phase requirements, demands perfectly constant gain when handling complex waveforms and transients;
5. Low output impedance and, inversely, high damping factor. At the very least, output impedance of an amplifier must be lower than the loudspeaker impedance;
6. Output power of 15–20 W for reproduction of orchestral music via a dynamic loudspeaker, or 10 W for a horn loudspeaker.

Williamson reviewed contemporary amplifier configurations, and, just like Cocking, settled on a low distortion push-pull, class A, triode output stage. Unlike Cocking, Williamson believed that such a stage can deliver high fidelity sound only when the amplifier is governed by 20–30 dB deep negative feedback loop (and thus the complete amplifier must have 20–30 dB higher open loop gain to compensate the effect of feedback). Deep feedback inevitably causes sudden, harsh onset of distortion at overload but Williamson was content with this flaw. He argued that it is a price worth paying for an improvement in linearity at medium and high power levels. On the contrary, wrote Williamson, slow but steady rise of distortion to 3–5%, as advocated by Kellogg, is distinctly unwanted in a high fidelity system.

=== Prototypes and tests ===
Valve complement of the original Williamson amplifier was determined by scarce supply in wartime Britain. The two suitable and available output valves were either the PX25 triode, or a triode-connected KT66 beam tetrode. Williamson initially used the PX25, an already obsolete directly-heated triode introduced in 1932. (Note: The PX25 was a unique directly-heated power triode, with an unusually high voltage gain (μ=9). A PX25 amplifier would have more than twice open loop gain than an amplifier employing typical directly-heated triodes like 2A3 or AD1 (μ=4).) In his second prototype, Williamson used the more efficient KT66, which became the valve of choice in post-war period. Powered from +500 V power supply, the KT66 prototype delivered 20 Watts at no more than 0.1% distortion. A less costly +425V power supply enabled 15 Watt output power at no more than 0.1% distortion; this arrangement became standard for the Williamson amplifier and defined its physical layout. The complete prototype system, including the amplifier, the experimental magnetic pickup and a Goodmans full-range speaker in an acoustical labyrinth enclosure, has proven to Williamson that a low distortion, deep feedback amplifier, indeed, sounded superior to amplifiers without feedback. The difference was particularly audible with the best available shellac records, despite the physical limitations of this low-fidelity format.

The prototypes impressed the Marconi management, who granted Williamson unlimited access to the company's test facilities and introduced him to the people from Decca Records. The latter provided Williamson with precious, exclusive test material - sample records of the experimental Decca ffrr system, the first true high fidelity medium in the United Kingdom. These records, which exceeded any preexisting media in sound quality, helped Williamson with fine-tuning his prototypes. He was certain that he was now firmly on the right track, but neither Marconi, nor its parent the General Electric Company were willing to invest in mass production of amplifiers for the civilian market. The design was not interesting to company lawyers either, because it did not contain anything patentable. Williamson merely put together well-known circuits and solutions.

=== Publication ===
In February 1946 Williamson left Marconi, moved to Edinburgh and joined Ferranti. A few months later a senior Marconi salesman, who sought new means of promoting the KT66 to general public, noticed Williamson's 1944 report about his amplifier prototypes, and sent it for publication to Wireless World. Chief editor H. F. Smith knew Williamson for his earlier contributions; he contacted the author directly and requested a detailed article written specifically for the DIY readers. Williamson promptly responded, but for unknown reasons the publication, originally slotted for 1946, was delayed until April–May 1947. While the paper was waiting for print, the magazine had published the new version of Cocking's Quality amplifier. Cocking, as the technical editor of Wireless World, certainly had precedence; according to Peter Stinson, he was sceptical about the Williamson amplifier, believing that his own design needed no further improvements.

By 1947 British industry had already released two amplifiers of comparable sound quality. Harold Leak announced production of his Leak Point One (Note: The name Point One emphasized 0.1% distortion rating claimed by Leak. His aggressive marketing provoked public suspicion in the validity and necessity of such low ratings.) in September 1945; (Note: For a detailed account of Leak's work, see Spicer, S. (2000). Firsts in High Fidelity: The Products and History of H.J. Leak & Co. Ltd. Audioxpress magazine. pp. 61–67. ISBN 9781882580316. OL 8683702M.) later in the same year Peter Walker published the first sketch of his distributed-load output stage that would become the Quad II production model. Leak and Walker tried to commercialize their ideas on the meagre post-war British market; their achievements were practically unknown outside of the United Kingdom. Williamson did the opposite: he donated his design to worldwide DIY community, thus securing lasting popular following.

In August 1949 Williamson, responding to letters from the readers, published the "New Version" of this amplifier. The article dealt extensively with construction, tuning and troubleshooting issues, however, its main objective was to address stability issues reported in letters from the readers. Apart from the additional frequency compensation network, a biasing potentiometer and a new, indirectly-heated rectifier valve that was not available in 1947, the circuit remained the same. In October 1949 – January 1950 and May 1952 Williamson published a series of articles on matching preamplifier stages and brief "Replies to Queries" concerning assembly and testing. A collection of articles published by Williamson in 1947–1950 was printed as a standalone 36-page brochure in 1952, with a second edition in 1953. The Williamson amplifier itself, as described in the August 1949 issue of Wireless World, remained unchanged.

=== Reception ===
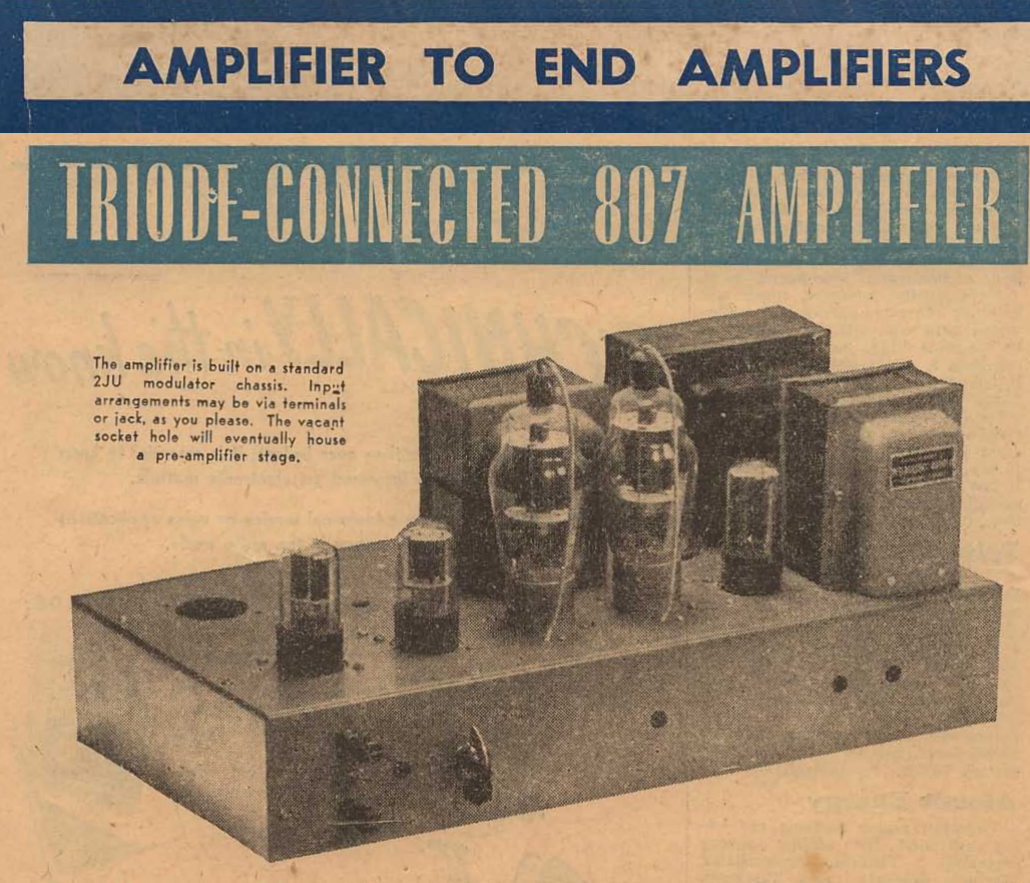
"Amplifier to End Amplifiers". Radio and Hobbies, Australia, March 1948. The sample shown here uses American 6SN7 and 807 valves and a surplus chassis of an Australian-made radio transmitter. However, Radio and Hobbies did not credit Williamson as the author of the original

The Williamson amplifier was an instant success. The publication coincided with the resumption of television broadcasting, the beginning of FM broadcasting, (Note: Regular FM broadcasting in both the United States and the United Kingdom began in 1946. By April–May 1947 British FM transmissions were still limited in duration and area covertage; Williamson in his opening article anticipated "the possible extension of u.h.f. high-quality transmissions".) the release of the first high fidelity gramophone records (Decca ffrr and the LP record), and the "discovery" of the captured German Magnetophon. (Note: The Magnetophon itself was not new; in fact, broadcast-quality production models were built and presented to general public before the outbreak of World War II. In this photograph, an AEG Magnetophon is installed in a Finnish broadcast studio in anticipation of the failed 1940 Summer Olympics. However, Americans and Britons "discovered" the tape recorder only after the war. It is true, however, that the Germans perfected the technology throughout the war, and by 1945 new Magnetophons were far superior to the 1939 model.) The high fidelity media that did not exist in the 1930s became a reality, and the public wanted playback equipment of matching quality. Off-the-shelf amplifiers available in 1947 were not fit for the task. At the same time, electronic components markets were flooded with military surplus, including cheap American 6L6 and 807 power valves. For a while, DIY construction was the only way to obtain high fidelity amplification. Thousands of amateurs began copying the Williamson design; the required transformers and chassis were soon provided by industry.

In September 1947 Australians R. H. Astor and Fritz Langford-Smith adapted the Williamson circuit for American 6SN7 and 807 valves; a 6L6 variant followed soon. British and Australian press was unanimously enthusiastic: "by far the best we have ever tested ... extraordinary linearity and lack of harmonic and intermodulation distortion", "amplifier to end [all] amplifiers", "absolute tops for obtaining natural reproduction" and so on. America lagged behind by about two years: first reviews appeared in the second half of 1949, and were just as complimentary. American companies adapted the circuit to locally available components, and soon began importing "premium" British valves and transformers, thus launching the market for British hi-fi in the United States. By the end of 1949 the Williamson amplifier became a universally recognized reference design, and a starting point for all valve designs employing global feedback.

The spread of DIY construction and the abundance of publications addressed to the amateurs had a solid economic reason: factory-made electronics of the 1940s were too expensive. The industry has not yet reorganized for mass production of affordable consumer products. Home construction of valve electronics was relatively simple and promised considerable savings. The number of home-made Williamson amplifiers is estimated at least in hundreds of thousands; they absolutely dominated the DIY scene in English-speaking countries. Stereo has not been commercialized yet; almost all surviving Williamson amplifiers are monaural. Each one differs in minor details, assembly quality is usually inferior to factory-made models. In the 21st century these monaural amplifiers are commonly sold at online auctions, but finding a matching pair is almost impossible.

Small-scale factory production in the United Kingdom began in February 1948; first big manufacturer, Rogers, announced production in October 1948. In the early 1950s the Williamson amplifier dominated factory production in both the United Kingdom and the United States; John Frieborn of Radio-Electronics wrote in 1953 that "since Williamson published the first description of his High-Quality Audio Amplifier, other audio designers had two apparent choices, beating him [Williamson] or joining him."

== Design features ==
=== Specifications ===
- Tube complement, 1947 version: 4x L63 (each equivalent to 6J5), 2x KT66, 1x U52 directly-heated rectifier. The 1949 version also provided for the use of 6SN7 or B65 double triodes, and replaced rectifier with the 53KU indirectly-heated type;
- Output power and maximum distortion: 15 W RMS at no more than 0.1% THD;
- Intermodulation: not specified (Williamson did not have the necessary test equipment);
- Frequency range: 10-20000 Hz at ±0.2 dB; 3-60000 Hz at ±3 dB;
- Phase shift within 10-20000 Hz: "never exceeds a few degrees" at the extremes of audio spectrum;
- Noise and hum: -85 dB below maximum output, almost entirely consisting of mains frequency hum.

=== Topology ===
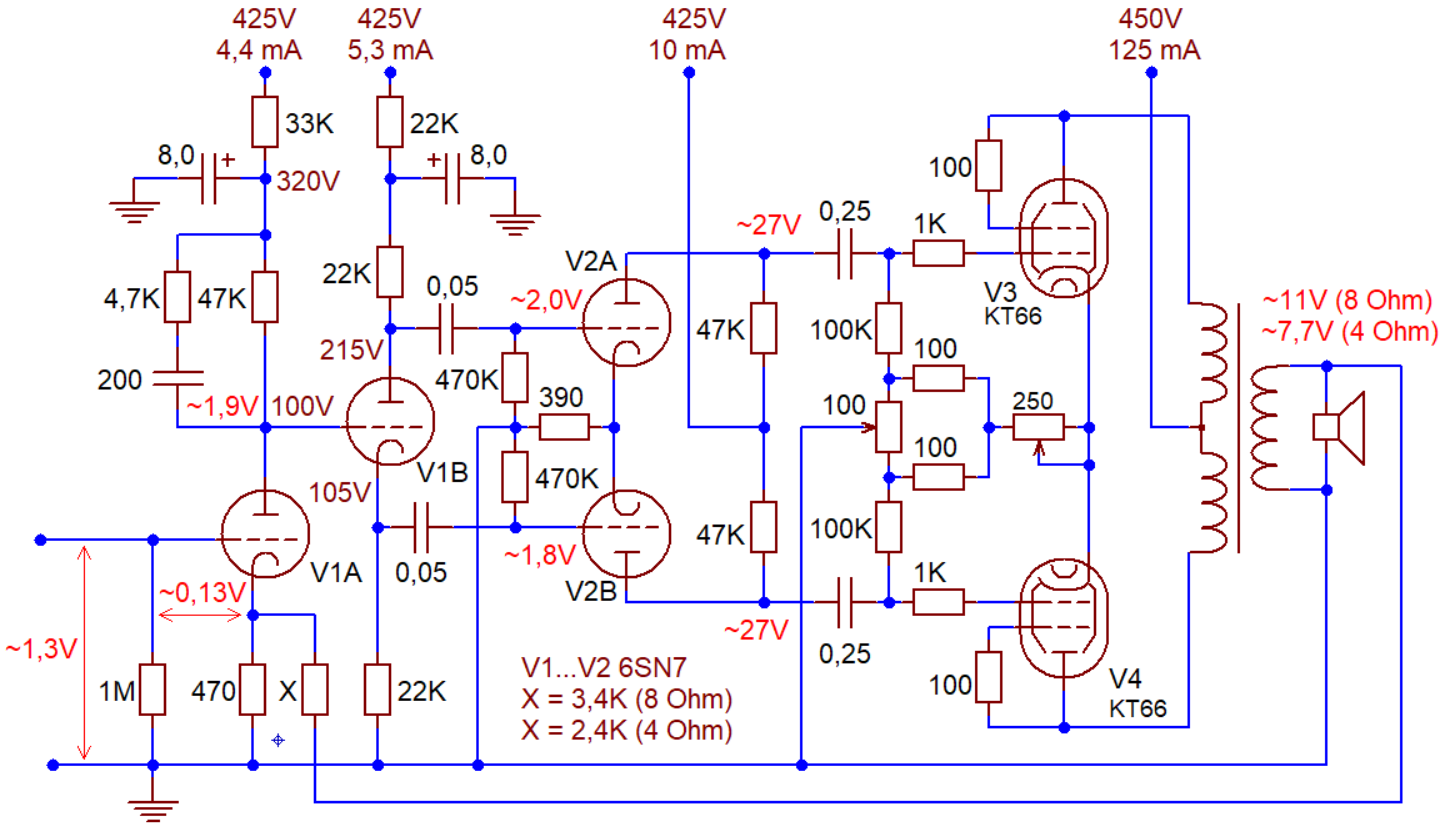
The 1949 version of the Williamson circuit. Power supply components omitted. AC voltages at 15 W output power, specified by Williamson in peak volts, shown recalculated to effective sine volts. Value of feedback resistor X depends on load impedance (two options shown)

The Williamson amplifier is a four-stage, push-pull, class A triode valve amplifier built around a high quality, wideband output transformer. Its second (concertina-type phase splitter, V1B), third (driver, V2A and V2B) and fourth (output, V3 and V4) stages follow Cocking's Quality Amplifier circuit. The added first stage (V1A) is a dedicated error amplifier, which compensates for the loss of gain caused by negative feedback. Williamson optimized operating points of each stage for best linearity with sufficient overload reserve. The output stage is biased into pure class A; traditionally it used triode-connected beam tetrodes or pentodes. With American 807 or British KT66 valves (Williamson recommended the latter type) and specified power supply the amplifier delivered 15 watts of output power. Further increase in output, according to Williamson, required use of four output valves; his 1947 article mentions construction of a 70-watt prototype.

The plate of the first stage and the grid of the phase splitter are connected directly. This configuration, known since 1940, was still uncommon in 1947; American designers considered it a novelty even in the early 1950s. Phase splitter, driver and output stage are capacitively coupled. Cathode bypass capacitors are absent: Williamson, like Cocking before him, tried to linearize open-loop performance of each stage, and deliberately sacrificed gain for linearity; he was also concerned with potential low-frequency instability introduced by added capacitances. The circuit in either 1947 or 1949 variant contains no electrolytic capacitors; its power supply uses a CLC π-filter with two 8 μF paper capacitors, with a further LC filter feeding the first three stages.

Derivative designs of the 1950s often deviated from Williamson's recommendations while retaining his four-stage topology. According to Peter Stinson, this alone is not sufficient to be called a Williamson amplifier. A true Williamson amplifier must meet five criteria simultaneously:

1. All four stages must use triodes; the output stage may use triode-connected tetrodes or pentodes;
2. Output stage must operate in class A;
3. Phase splitter must be directly coupled to the input stage;
4. High-quality output transformer must conform to the original Williamson specification;
5. Global negative feedback loop must be connected from transformer secondary to the cathode of the input triode, and be exactly 20 dB deep.

=== Feedback ===
The 20 dB (ten-to-one) feedback loop of the Williamson amplifier wraps around all four stages and the output transformer. According to Richard C. Hitchcock, (Note: A long-time research engineer with Westinghouse Electric Corporation in Pittsburgh, Richard C. Hitchcock is now remembered as the creator of the 'Westinghouse Organ' (also called 'Electric Radio Organ', 1930).) "this is a severe test of design and is one of the outstanding features of the Williamson circuit." (Note: The original Leak Point One design of 1945 also employed four stages and global negative feedback, and was even less stable than the Williamson. Harold Leak soon abandoned the idea and in 1947 released the successful three-stage Leak TL12.) Williamson wrote that the depth of feedback can be easily increased from 20 to 30 dB, but the audible improvements of deeper feedback will be diminishingly low.

All frequency compensation components are located in the first and second stages of the circuit: their local smoothing RC filters subtly alter frequency response at infrasonic frequencies. An additional RC-filter in the first stage, introduced by Williamson in the 1949 version, prevents oscillations at ultrasonic frequencies. Feedback voltage divider is connected to the transformer secondary, thus feedback depth is dependent on loudspeaker impedance, and setting it at precisely 20 dB requires altering the divider ratio. The voltage divider is purely resistive, with no capacitive or inductive frequency compensation components. According to Williamson, a capacitor shunting the upper leg of the divider is only necessary for inferior-quality transformers; if the transformer matches requirements set by Williamson, the capacitor is useless.

=== Transformer ===
Williamson was confident that the output transformer is the most critical component in any valve amplifier. Even before applying global feedback, the transformer is liable for at least four types of distortion. Their causes cannot be addressed simultaneously, and the designer must make a compromise between conflicting requirements. Global feedback partially suppresses distortion, but also tightens requirements to the bandwidth of the transformer.

Stability theory predicted that an amplifier built to Williamson's specifications could only be stable if the bandwidth of its output transformer was no less than 2.5...160000 Hz. This was impractically wide for an audio amplifier, requiring an exceptionally large, complex and expensive transformer. Williamson, seeking a working solution, had to decrease phase margin to a bare minimum; even then, the required bandwidth had to be no less than 3,3...60000 Hz. Such a transformer, driven by a pair of triode-connected KT66, had to have primary winding inductance of at least 100 H, and leakage inductance of no more than 33 mH. These were extremely demanding specifications for the period, far exceeding anything available on the consumer market. The Williamson transformers had to be heavier, larger, more complex and more expensive than typical audio transformers, and yet they could only guarantee minimally acceptable stability. A wider phase margin, wrote Williamson, was highly desirable but required absolutely impractical values of primary inductance.

=== Overload behaviour ===
Valve amplifiers with capacitive coupling between the driver stage and the output stage do not clip in the same manner as transistor amplifiers (e.g. clamping output voltage to one of the supply rails). Instead, they choke when large signal swings intermittently attempt to bias the grids of the output valves above zero. Positively-biased grids begin conducting, but the coupling capacitors cannot delivered required current. Grid voltages do not reach target values, output waveform flattens. (Note: Transformer-coupled valve amplifiers do not choke, as long as the driver valve(s) can deliver required grid current(s). However, interstage transformers are incompatible with global negative feedback. A series combination of two transformers (interstage and output) is inherently unstable; it cannot be enclosed in a feedback loop.)

Feedback attempts to overcome choking by increasing driver voltage swing, but fails because coupling capacitors cannot physically pass direct current. Resulting distortion pattern, as Williamson proved with photocopies of oscillograms and Lissajous curves, is "of the desirable type", i.e. with abrupt onset of distortion at the extremes of otherwise highly linear response curves.

=== Stability problem ===
Frequency, phase and transient response of various Williamson amplifiers

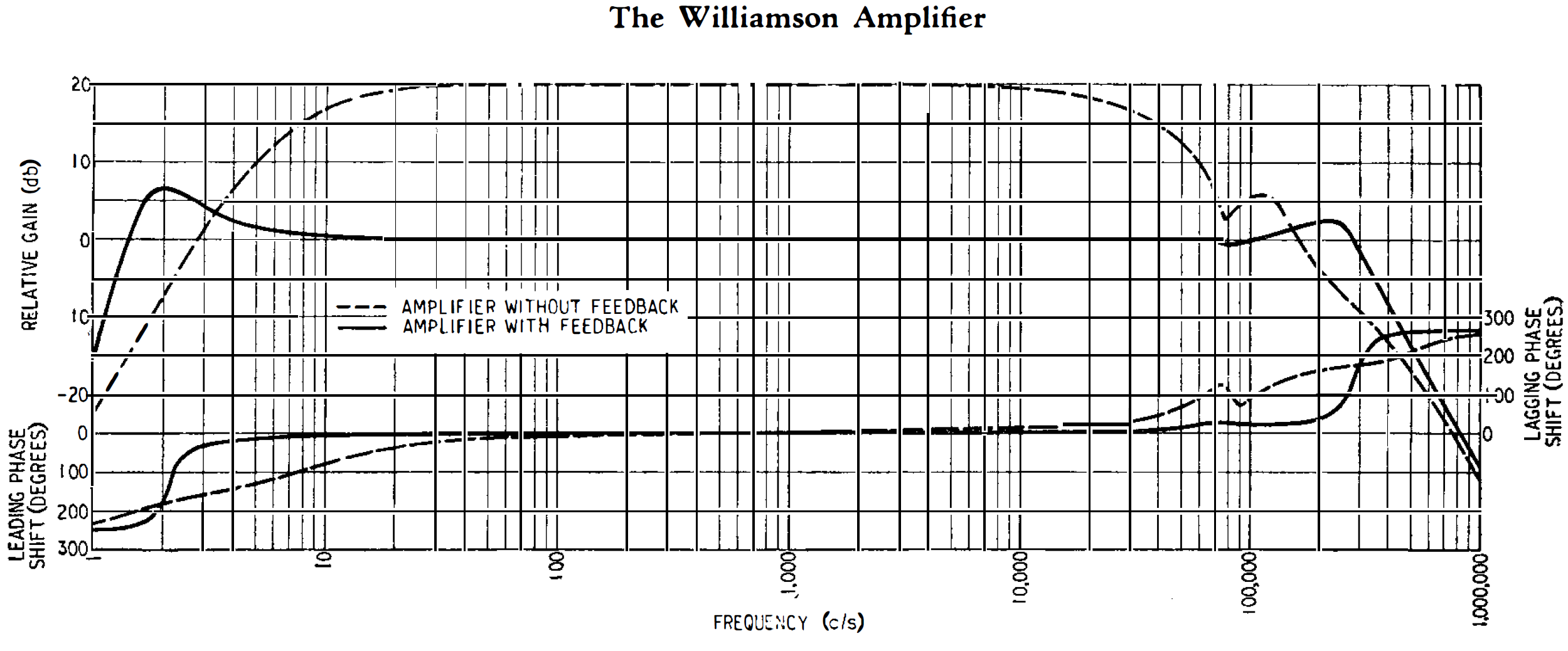
Williamson's 1949 design. Dashed lines: open loop response, solid lines: closed loop response. Resonant bumps at low and high extremes indicate narrow phase margins

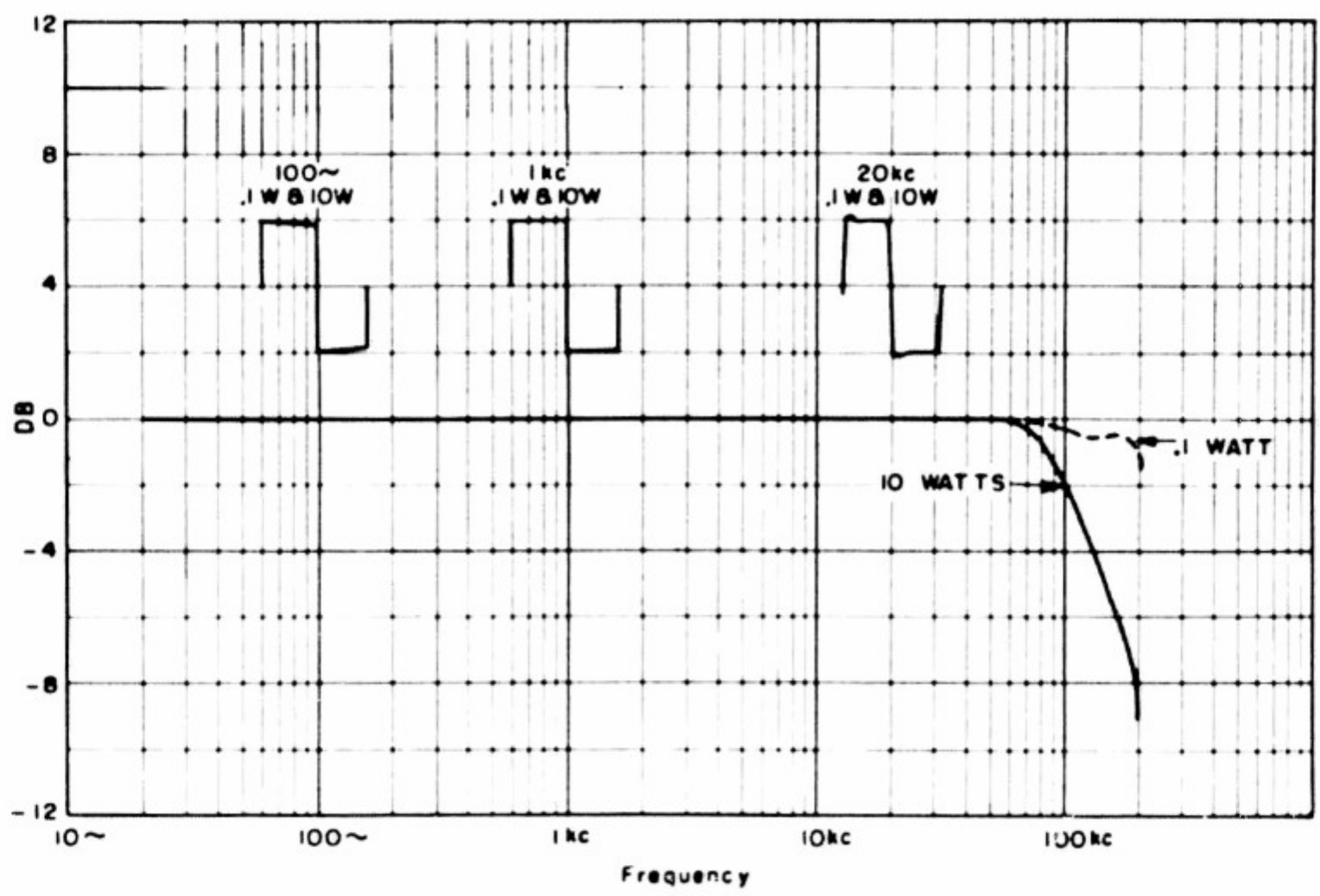
Commercial amplifier with a high quality transformer, US NRL measurements

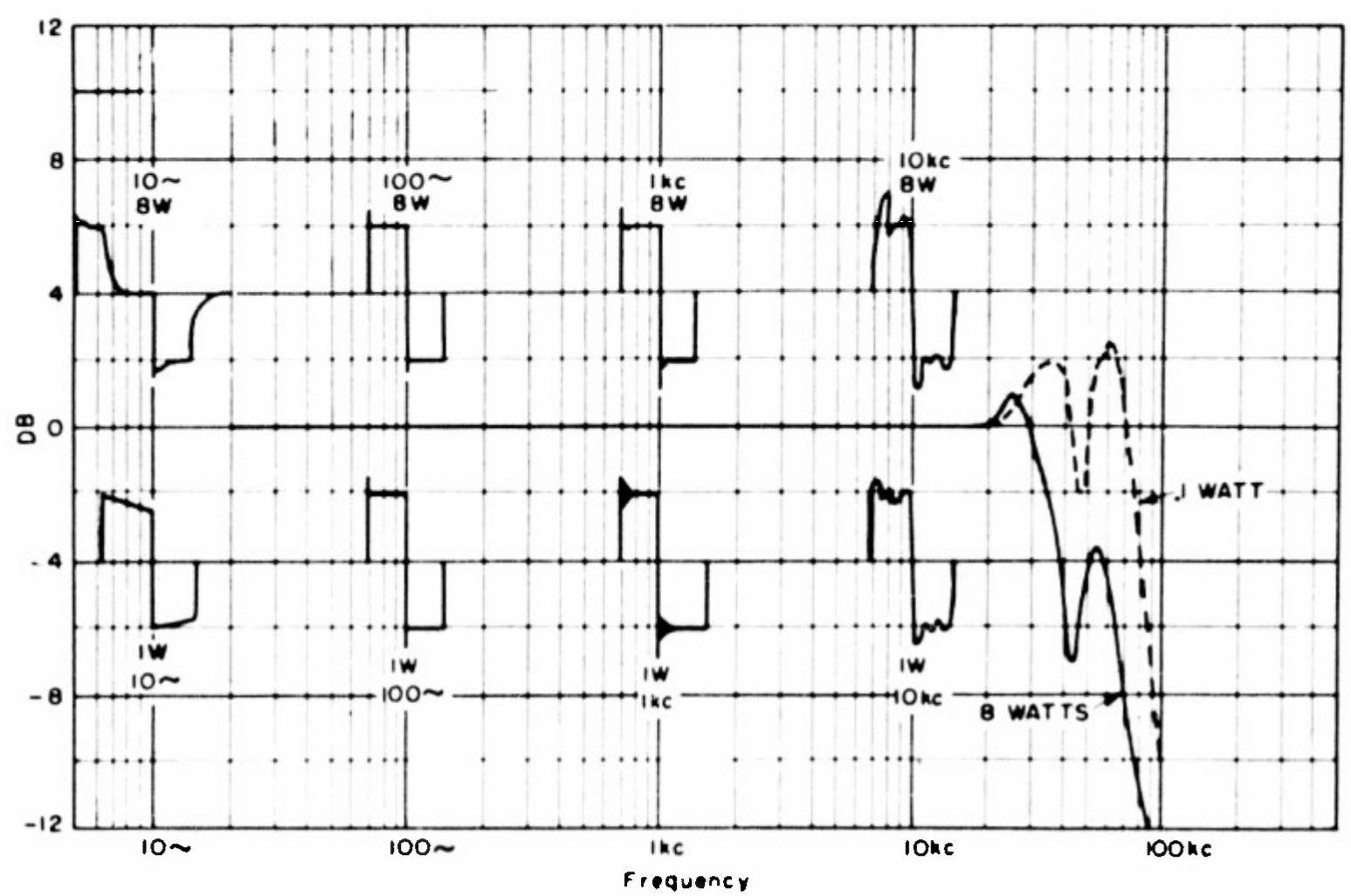
Commercial amplifier with an inferior transformer, US NRL measurements

The first attempts to build the Williamson amplifier revealed its tendency to oscillate due to very narrow phase margin. Astor and Langford-Smith, who gave the Williamson excellent ratings, reported that "for fairly large outputs at low frequencies a high frequency oscillation about 60 kC/s [kHz] would commence and be accompanied by a pulsed output of some other frequency". The Australians, armed with first-class test equipment, (Note: Astor and Langford-Smith were staff engineers at AWA, the country's largest radio manufacturer and broadcaster.) suppressed the 60 kHz oscillation with small capacitors on screen grids, but could not identify and suppress the cause of "some other" oscillations. Later, technicians of the United States Naval Research Laboratory examined seven different commercially available Williamson amplifiers, and found that all of them oscillated at infrasonic frequencies of 2...3 Hz. Replacement of output transformers affected stability only at audio and ultrasonic frequencies. The best transformers displayed perfectly flat frequency response from 10 to 100,000 Hz, but were also prone to infrasonic "breathing". The worst transformers displayed prominent ultrasonic resonances that, however, did not cause sustained oscillations. Some "ringed" at relatively low frequencies of 30 to 50 kHz, others extended into 500...700 kHz range.

Custom-built Williamson transformers were imperfect, but general-purpose, off-the-shelf transformers used by amateurs were far worse. Their resonances could only be tamed by narrowing the amplifier's bandwidth. The extent of stability problem in the DIY community remains unknown: the editors of Wireless Worlds were flooded with readers' letters, but preferred to redirect them to Williamson. What is known is that the inventor was compelled to revise and improve the design; he took a leave from his job at Ferranti and presented the second version of the Williamson in 1949. Williamson could not fix the fundamental stability problem; the "New version" was just barely stable. Independent analysis published in December 1950 proved that the revised Williamson amplifier remained prone to both infrasonic and ultrasonic oscillations.

According to the analysis, infrasonic open-loop response of the Williamson amplifier is shaped by three high-pass filters: two interstage RC filters, each with a cutoff frequency of 6 Hz, and the output stage RL filter, formed by the valves' output impedances and the transformer's primary inductance. At zero input signal, the nonlinear RL filter has a cutoff frequency of 3 Hz. (Note: Assuming 100 H primary inductance and 2 kOhm plate impedance, as specified by Williamson.) This combination of cutoff frequencies, wrapped inside a 20–30 dB frequency loop, is unstable. Williamson tried to suppress it with a compensation network, also serving as a smoothing filter. The transformer's nonlinearity also improved stability: at high signal currents effective inductance of the primary increased, causing a decrease in cutoff frequency and a rise in phase margin. The simplest solution was to spread apart cutoff frequencies of the RC filters, provided that the output transformer conforms to the Williamson specification. For example, the 1952 Ultralinear Williamson by David Hafler and Herbert Keroes had these frequencies set at 1.3 and 6 Hz.

Precise analysis at ultrasonic frequencies is impossible due to the asymmetry of the phase splitter stage, and unknown parasitics and nonlinearities of the output stage. Depending on the chosen analysis model, open-loop response can be roughly approximated with a combination of either four or five low-pass filters. Different authors used different approaches and estimated somewhat different cutoff points of these filters, but in each case at least three of four or five cutoff frequencies were dangerously close to each other, which was a certain sign of instability. Williamson, again, fixed the problem with an RC compensation network, but even then phase margin remained dangerously low. DIYers had to tackle oscillations themselves: some added shunting capacitors to the screen grids, others tweaked layout and wiring, or deliberately narrowed the amplifier's bandwidth, negating the benefits of the original circuit.

=== Component problem ===
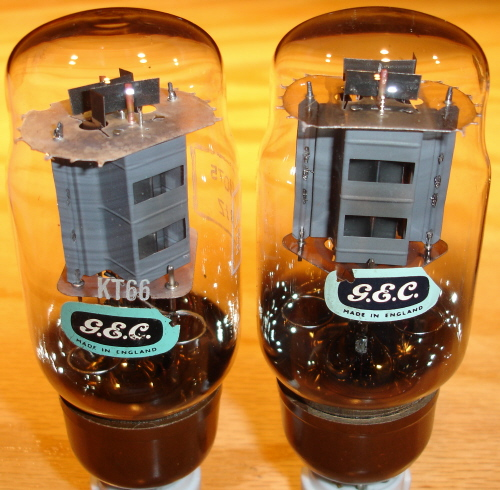
British KT66 beam tetrodes by General Electric Company. Experience has proved that American substitutes were not an even match for the original KT66.

The Williamson amplifier was very sensitive to the quality and parameters of passive components and valves. Carbon and composition-type resistors generated excessive noise and caused harmonic distortion; American valves used as substitutes for the British types specified by Williamson, could not match their performance. Williamson warned that the KT66 has no direct substitutes, and should be preferred over any alternatives.

Amateurs who copied the Williamson amplifier were unable to identify and fix its critical weak points. An amateur armed with an analogue multimeter could "see" infrasonic oscillations by watching the instrument needle, but fixing high-frequency issues required an oscilloscope with bandwidth of at least 1 or 2 MHz bandwidth. In the 1950s bandwidths of many commercial oscilloscopes were too narrow for the task, and even these models were too expensive for the DIYers.

Articles by professional engineers dealing with analysis and fine tuning of the Williamson amplifier were published relatively late, when the original DIY enthusiasm had already faded - in 1952, 1957, 1961. Martin Kiebert, (Note: Martin Peter Vlamingh Kiebert Jr, born in 1908, attended University of Idaho and Reed College. Prior to World War II he worked as electronics engineer at KIRO (AM), the Federal Communications Commission, and various consultancies based in Washington, D.C. During the war he was stationed with the Bureau of Aeronautics, reaching the rank of Lieutenant commander in 1945. After the war, according to Kiebert's publications, he worked for Bendix, Convair and Mallory.) who built professional-grade Williamson amplifiers for his laboratory at Bendix Corporation, identified five sources of distortion caused by inferior components other than the transformer:

1. Excessive noise and electromagnetic interference caused by noisy carbon or composition-type resistors and incorrect layout of the first stage. Replacement of resistors specified by Williamson with wirewound resistors could improve signal-to-noise ratio by 12 dB. Replacement of 6SN7 with low-noise 12AY7 could gain another 12 dB;
2. Frequency and harmonic distortion caused by asymmetry of passive components in two sides of a push-pull circuit. Typical components of the 1950s had 20% tolerances, which was unacceptably high for the Williamson;
3. The 6SN7 driver stage was often unable to properly swing the KT66 grids, causing excessive distortion. According to Kiebert, the American 5687 dual triode was clearly superior. According to Talbot Wright, the 6SN7 was not at fault - distortion was caused by incorrectly set standing current, and could be improved by a simple increase in bias voltage;
4. Distortion in the feedback voltage divider. This critical function required low-distortion wirewound resistors;
5. Distortion was clearly influenced by the choice of output valves, however, Kiebert could not identify any specific rules.

Kiebert rated the design positively but warned the readers that following Williamson's instructions is possible only in a laboratory environment. The amplifier reveals its potential only with expensive, properly matched components that were out of reach of an average amateur. Even a perfectly built and tested Williamson amplifier would sooner or later need valve replacement, which would very likely cause an unexpected rise in distortion.

== Variants and derivatives ==
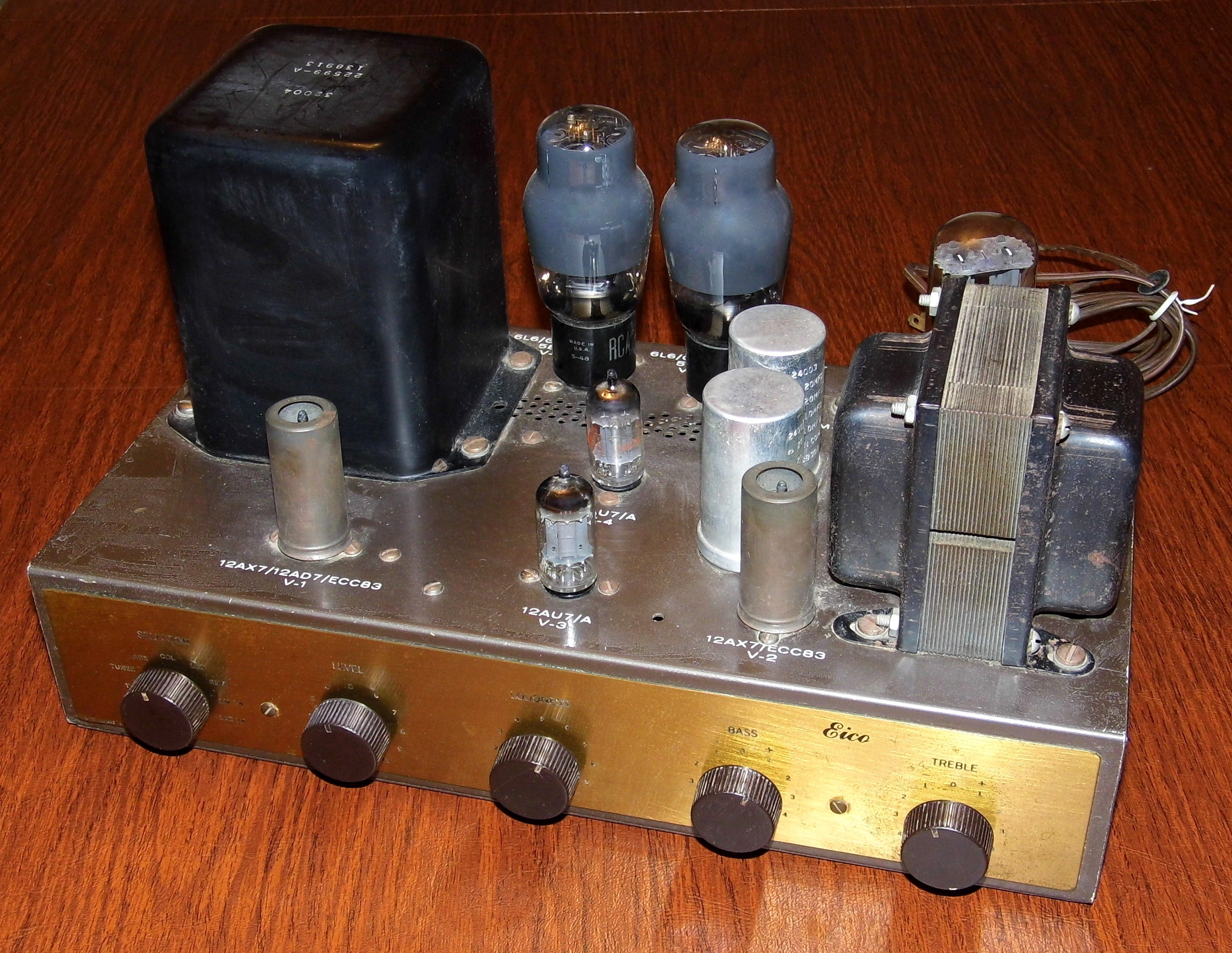
EICO HF-20 integrated amplifier, one of many inexpensive American Ultralinear Williamsons. In addition to ultralinear 6L6 output, it deviates from the original in having cathode bypass and frequency compensation capacitors in the output stage, and an inexpensive CRC power supply filter instead of CLC.

After 1950 the industry produced numerous derivatives of the Williamson amplifier, often deviating significantly from the principles outlined by its creator. In 1950 Herbert Keroes shunted common cathode resistor of his 807 amplifier with a large electrolytic capacitor which, according to Keroes, significantly reduced distortion at high output power. Contrary to recommendations by Cocking and Williamson, Keroes and his partner David Hafler used cathode shunt capacitors in most of their designs; by 1956 this approach became de facto industry standard. In the same 1956 Hafler used fixed bias in his EL34 Williamson. Later, fixed bias became a staple of Soviet and Russian Williamson-like designs that employed exotic output valves like the 6C4C directly-heated triode, the GU-50 generator pentode or the 6P45S horizontal deflection tetrode.

Throughout the 1950s, as prices of capacitors decreased, designers steadily increased their values. The original Williamson amplifier used 8 μF paper capacitors; by 1952 Kiebert uses 40 μF electrolytics; the 1955 reference design by Keroes used at least 250 μF bypass capacitors; the 1961 budget amplifier by Wright employed a total of 600 μF. Designers of the commercial Bell 2200 (Note: The Bell brand of domestic electronics was owned not by the Bell System companies, but by TRW Inc.) amplifier (1953) replaced direct coupling of the first two stages with capacitive coupling; the Stromberg-Carlson AR-425 (also 1953) use a tetrode-mode output stage in an otherwise familiar Williamson topology. Both Bell and Stromberg-Carson modifications further worsened stability, and required additional frequency compensation. Designers of the Bogen DB20 (1953) went even further, and combined global and local negative feedback loops with positive feedback in the output stage.

In December 1951 Hafler and Keroes began promoting the ultralinear stage - a method of distributing load between anode and screen grid of a pentode or tetrode, invented by Alan Blumlein in the 1930s. An ultralinear stage delivered 50% to 100% more output power than the same stage in triode connection, at roughly the same distortion, and cost less than a pure pentode or tetrode stage (the latter required a separate screen grid supply, the ultralinear did not need it). The first Ultralinear Williamson, employing a pair of 6L6 in a Williamson-like topology, delivered 20 W; their second model, built around more powerful 807 tetrodes, delivered 30 W. Very soon the American public acquired taste to high-power amplification, and the industry launched the "race for Watts". (Note: According to The Routledge Guide to Music Technology, the power race among valve amplifier manufacturers eventually stabilized at 75 W per channel mark. Transistor amplifiers easily surpassed it, and the race culminated in 1971 with the Phase Linear Model 700 designed by Bob Carver (250 W per channel). In the 1990s power ratings of THX-certified home cinema amplifiers crept even further up.) By 1955 Hafler and Keroes, now working separately, were offering 60-Watt models employing pairs of 6550 tetrodes or quartets of KT66s. Thus in less than a decade, step by step, the industry abandoned the principles set by Williamson, but continued to use his name as a convenient free trademark. In the 21st century it is even used for amplifiers without global negative feedback; the only thing they have in common with the true Williamson amplifier is the four-stage topology.

Following the success of Hafler and Keroes, American manufacturers like Eico, The Fisher, Harman/Kardon and Marantz disposed with "obsolete" power triodes and switched to ultralinear designs. Mullard, Britain's largest valve manufacturer and provider of reference designs to the European industry, publicly supported the novelty. Williamson's former employer, General Electric Company, followed suit and published a reference "30-Watt Williamson" design built around a pair of ultralinear-connected KT88. The original Williamson amplifier lost the race, just like alternative designs by Peter Walker and Frank McIntosh. In September 1952 Williamson and Walker (then business partners in the development of the Quad Electrostatic Loudspeaker) agreed that the ultralinear stage was, indeed, preferable in mass production. Williamson gradually stepped aside from audio engineering. He made his living by designing milling machines and flexible manufacturing systems, which later earned him election to the Royal Society, and never considered audio design a serious occupation for himself.

In 1956 most production amplifiers in North America followed the Ultralinear Williamson template, but in the next few years it was retired, too. The new three-stage reference design combined phase splitter and driver functions in one valve, and thus cost proportionally less than four-stage amplifiers. Hafler's Dynaco Stereo 70, which followed this topology, became the most produced valve amplifier in history. North American consumer market was flooded with millions of similar, almost identical amplifiers and receivers claiming 25 to 20 W per channel, as well as clones of less powerful British designs like the Mullard 5-10. Advertisements claimed that these models performed as well as the original Williamson, with higher output power and with guaranteed stability. The customers could not verify these claims, and had to rely to listening tests, hearsay and expert advice. The problem was partially addressed by the concept of subjective listening, advanced by Hafler and Keroes back in 1951: "Excellent measurements are a necessary but not a sufficient condition for the quality of sound. The listening test is one of most importance... the most stringent test of all". By the end of the 1960s subjectivist approach was adopted by the audiophiles and marketing people, who eagerly forgot about the objective principles devised by Williamson in the 1940s.

Objectively, many deep-feedback valve designs of the 1950s matched or exceeded the 0.1% distortion rating of the Williamson amplifier, but none could significantly improve on this figure. Williamson had found that valve amplifier performance was limited mostly by the output transformer. Transistor amplifiers did not have this limitation, and yet it took around 15 years to bring their performance to the level attained by Williamson in 1947.

== Sources ==
- Astor, R.H.; Langford-Smith, F. (1947). "The Design of a High Fidelity Amplifier" (PDF). Radiotronics (128): 99–102.
- Beaumont, J. H. (1950). "Williamson Type Amplifier using 6A5's" (PDF). Audio Engineering (October): 19–21.
- Bernard, W. B. (1957). "The Care and Treatment of Feedback Audio Amplifiers" (PDF). Audio (January): 20–22, 65–69.
- Byrith, C. (2000). Power Amplifiers with Valves (PDF). Lundahl Transformers.
- Cocking, W. T. (1934). "High Quality Amplification" (PDF). Wireless World (May 4, May 11, May 18): 302–304, 330–323, 336–339.
- Cocking, W. T. (1943). "The Quality Amplifier. Wartime Modifications to a Well-Known Design" (PDF). Wireless World (December): 355–358.
- Cocking, W. T. (1946). "Wireless World Quality Amplifier. Circuit Details" (PDF). Wireless World (January): 2–6.
- "Contributors". Proceedings of the IRE. 33 (8): 560–562. Aug 1945. Bibcode:1945PIRE...33..560.. doi:10.1109/JRPROC.1945.230873.
- Cooper, G. F. (1950). "Audio Feedback Design. Part III" (PDF). Radio-Electronics (December): 42–44.; also reprinted as
  - Crowhurst, N.; Cooper, G. F. (1956). "Chapter 2. Analysis and Design". High Fidelity Circuit Design. Gernsback Library. pp. 31–40.
- Crabbe, John (July 14, 2009). "John Crabbe: Firebrand". Stereophile (Interview). Interviewed by Harris, Steve.
- Dixon, T. O. (1953). Laboratory Tests of Some of the Popular Audio Amplifiers (PDF). Washington D.C.: United States Naval Research Laboratory. Archived from the original (PDF) on February 12, 2018.
- Electronics Australia, (editorial) (1990). "The Williamson Amplifier" (PDF). Electronics Australia (July): 1–4.
- Feilden, G. B. R. (1995). "David Theodore Nelson Williamson" (PDF). Biographical Memoirs of Fellows of the Royal Society. 41 (November): 516–532. doi:10.1098/rsbm.1995.0031.
- Frankland, S. (1996). "Single-ended vs. Push-pull, part I". Stereophile (December): 110–121.
- Frankland, S. (2002). "The Contest for High Fidelity: Western Electric vs RCA, Part I". Vacuum Tube Valley (18): 9–13.
- Frieborn, J. R. (1953). "High-Quality Circuits" (PDF). Radio-Electronics (September): 33–35.
- Hafler, D.; Keroes, H. (1951). "An Ultra-Linear Amplifier" (PDF). Audio Engineering (November): 15–17.
- Hafler, D.; Keroes, H. (1952). "Ultra-Linear Operation of the Williamson Amplifier" (PDF). Audio Engineering (June): 26–27, 43.
- Hafler, D. (1955a). "A 60-Watt Ultra-Linear Amplifier" (PDF). Radio and Television News (February): 45–47, 100–102.
- Hafler, D. (1955b). "High Power Williamson Amplifier for Hi-Fi". Radio-Electronics (December): 42–44.
- Hafler, D. (1956). "Modernize Your Williamson Amplifier". Audiocraft (January): 2–4.
- Hitchcock, R. (1959). "Chapter 15. Audio Frequency Amplifiers". In Keith Henney (ed.). Radio Engineering Handbook, 5th edition. McGraw-Hill.
- Holmes, Thom (2006). The Routledge Guide to Music Technology. CRC Press. ISBN 0-415-97324-4.
- Hood, John Linsley (1975). "Straight Wire With Gain?" (PDF). Studio Sound (4): 22–29.
- Hood, John Linsley (1994). "The Evolution of Audio Amplifier Design, Part I". Electronics in Action (February): 22–26.
- Hood, John Linsley (2006). Valve and Transistor Audio Amplifiers. Newnes. ISBN 0750633565.
- Jones, M. (2003). Valve Amplifiers (3rd ed.). Newnes. ISBN 0750656948.
- Jones, M. (2013). Building Valve Amplifiers (2nd revised ed.). Newnes. ISBN 9780080966397.
- Keroes, H. (1950). "Building the Williamson Amplifier" (PDF). Radio and Television News (December): 52–53, 76.
- Keroes, H. (1955). "Adapting the Ultra-Linear Williamson to 6550 operation". Radio and Television News (November): 1–3.
- Kiebert, M. V. (1952). "The Williamson Type Amplifier brought Up to Date" (PDF). Audio Engineering (August): 18–19, 35.
- Kitteson, C. (1995). "The History and Future of Dynaco Tube Audio". Vacuum Tube Valley (1): 5–7.
- Marshall, J. (1956). "High Fidelity Power Amplifiers" (PDF). Radio-Electronics (May): 59–62.
- Mitchell, R. (1950). "A Wide-Range Feedback Amplifier" (PDF). Radio and Television News (October): 67–68, 166–167.
- Radio and Hobbies, (editorial) (1948). "Triode-Connected 807 Amplifier" (PDF). Radio and Hobbies in Australia (March): 16–21.
- Sarser, David; Sprinkle, M.C. (1949). "Musician's Amplifier" (PDF). Audio Engineering (November): 33–36.
- Stinson, P. R. (2015). The Williamson Amplifier of 1947 (PDF).
- TJB (1984). "Walter Tusting Cocking (obituary)" (PDF). Wireless World (May): 8.
- Williams, N. (1990). "The rise and fall of the thermionic valves or tubes - 2" (PDF). Electronics Australia (6): 42–47.
- Williamson, D. T. N. (1953). The Williamson Amplifier. Second edition (PDF). London: Illiffe. A collection of articles from the late 1940s and early 1950s, including:
  - Williamson, D. T. N. (1947). "Design for a High Quality Amplifier. Basic Requirements". Wireless World (April): 118–121.
  - Williamson, D. T. N. (1947). "Design for a High Quality Amplifier.Details of Chosen Circuit and Its Performance". Wireless World (May): 162–163.
  - Williamson, D. T. N. (1949). "High Quality Amplifier: The New Version". Wireless World (August): 282–287.
- Williamson, D. T. N.; Walker, P. J. (1952). "Amplifiers and Superlatives" (PDF). Wireless World (September). London: 357–361.
- Wallace, E.; Williamson, D. T. N. (1953). "Adventurers in Sound: D. T. N. Williamson" (PDF). High Fidelity Magazine (July–August): 32–33, 108–110.
- Wright, T. (1961). "Improving the Williamson Amplifier" (PDF). Electronics World (June): 104–106.
- Баев, А. (1977). "Усилитель НЧ мощностью 130 Вт" [130W LF Amplifier]. В Помощь Радиолюбителю (in Russian) (58): 32–42.
- Романюк, Ю. (1965). "Стереофонический усилитель с акустическим агрегатом" [Stereo Amplifier with Acoustic Unit]. Радио (in Russian) (10): 47–49.
- Торопкин, М. В. (2006). Ламповый Hi-Fi усилитель своими руками (2-е издание) [DIY Tube Hi-Fi Amplifier (2nd Edition)] (in Russian). СПБ: Наука и техника. ISBN 5943871772.
