= David Theodore Nelson Williamson =

Scottish electronics engineer

(David) Theodore Nelson Williamson (also known as D. T .N. Williamson; 15 February 1923 – 10 May 1992) was a Scottish electronics engineer, most notable for a design of early high fidelity valve amplifier known as the Williamson amplifier, that originally featured "OSRAM" brand valves (such as KT66 "Kinkless" Tetrode and L63 triode) made by the M. O. Valve Company, for which he had worked until 1946. The design was published in a series of articles in the influential British Wireless World magazine, beginning in May 1947. He continued his interest in hi-fi and writing for Wireless World after his move to Ferranti, and became Group Director of Engineering with Rank Xerox in 1974 before retiring in 1976. He was elected a Fellow of the Royal Society (F.R.S.) in 1968.

== Early life and education ==
Williamson was born in Edinburgh, to David Williamson and Ellie (née Nelson). The Williamsons lived in a large town house (originally the Manse of the adjacent church) near the King's Theatre. His father, who ran a car hire business, was a practical man, who undertook all the maintenance work- including plumbing, furniture-making, and converting the whole house from gas to electricity- himself, with the assistance of family members. When young, Williamson caught tuberculosis from a maid, which left him weakened for the rest of his life and prevented him joining any of the Armed services during the war. He was educated at George Heriot's School, where he twice competed for and won the prize for Applied Science. In 1940, he became an undergraduate in engineering at the University of Edinburgh. Although he later said he learned a great deal, particularly about hydraulics, strength of materials, and heat engines (amongst other things), he left in 1943 without a degree after failing a mandatory mathematics examination; there appears to have been some misunderstanding at the time, since his professor told him he was eligible for an honours degree. He received an honorary doctorate from the university in 1985, having received one from Heriot-Watt University in 1971.

== Career ==
Marconi-Osram Company Ltd July 1943 to February 1946
Ferranti Ltd February 1946 to December 1960
The Molins Machine Company Ltd February 1961 to September 1973
Rank Xerox 1974 to 1976

== Personal life ==
On 8 June 1951, Williamson married Alexandra Janet Smith Neilson, who worked in the same laboratory as he did at the Ferranti Edinburgh Works; they had two sons and two daughters. They moved to Kent in 1961, later living at Leighton Buzzard, before moving to Italy in 1979, where they lived near Lake Trasimeno in Umbria.
