= Hafler =

Hafler is a surname. Common uses of the name include:

- David Hafler, the high-end audio designer and manufacturer
- The Hafler Trio
