= JLH =

JLH may refer to:

- "JLH" (song), a song by King Missile
- Jabb Love Hua
- Jennifer Love Hewitt
- John Lee Hooker
- John Linsley Hood
- Jon Ludvig Hammer
- Joseph Lowthian Hudson
- Justice League Heroes
