= Dynaco =

American manufacturer of hi-fi equipment

- Type: Audio system manufacturer
- Founded: 1955; 71 years ago
- Founder: David Hafler and Ed Laurent

Dynaco was an American hi-fi audio system manufacturer popular in the 1960s and 1970s for its wide range of affordable, yet high quality audio components. Founded by David Hafler and Ed Laurent in Philadelphia, Pennsylvania in 1955, its best known product was the ST-70 tube stereo amplifier. They also manufactured other tube and solid state amplifiers, preamplifiers, radio tuners and bookshelf loudspeakers. Dynaco was liquidated in 1980, and the trademark is now owned by Radial Engineering Ltd.

== Early company history ==
In 1950 David Hafler and Herb Keroes started a Philadelphia-based company called Acrosound to build and sell audio-quality output transformers, primarily for home electronics hobbyists. The two men refined and developed the ultra-linear audio circuit pioneered by British audio electronics engineer Alan Blumlein, using taps from the output transformer to feed signal back into the output stage screen grid circuitry. The Acrosound transformer circuit was later used in many home-built and commercial hi-fi amplifiers in the early 1950s. In order to appeal to a wider consumer market, Hafler decided to design and build entire power amplifiers as build-it-yourself kits, complete with preassembled, tested circuit boards that only required the customer to wire the boards to the transformers, controls, and power supply to complete the project. This was a considerable advance over other audio system kits of the day, which generally required the purchaser to assemble and test the PC boards themselves, a relatively precise and time-consuming task.

In 1954 Dave Hafler and Herb Keroes parted company. During a visit to the New York-based Brociner Electronics the same year, Hafler met an audio engineer named Ed Laurent, who had designed a novel single-tube driver circuit for a power amplifier. In 1955, the two men founded the Dyna Company (later Dynaco) with the intention of not only producing transformers but high-quality audio circuitry. The company was incorporated in October 1955, with business premises located at 617 N. 41st St in Philadelphia. Dynaco's first product was the Mk. II 50-watt power amplifier. Available as a kit or preassembled unit, the Mk. II was sold for several years until its replacement in 1956 by the Mk. III amplifier, which produced 60 watts. Hafler wrote an article for Radio-Electronics Magazine in 1955 delineating the design of a high-power version of the Williamson amplifier using ultra-linear circuitry and Dynaco's new output transformers. The Williamson amplifier utilized a slightly different circuit design from the Mk. II and Mk. III. Shortly thereafter, the company moved its business operations to 3912 Powelton Avenue in Philadelphia, where they remained for several years.

== Products ==
Today, Dynaco is best remembered for its highly regarded vacuum tube stereo amplifier, the Stereo 70 (ST 70). Introduced in 1959, the ST 70 was available as a kit (Dynakit) intended for assembly by the purchaser or as a complete factory-wired unit. The ST 70 used four EL34 output tubes, one GZ34/5AR4 rectifier tube, two 7199 input (driver) tubes, two output transformers, one power transformer, and a preassembled printed circuit board (PCB) containing the driver circuit. It produced 35 watts per channel. The driver circuit had a single 7199 pentode/triode tube per channel and used the driver tube to handle both voltage amplification and phase splitting. The output transformers are an ultralinear design, whereby part of the primary winding is fed back to the output tube's screen grid. This design reduced distortion and improved audio quality.

The Dynaco ST-70, introduced in 1959, is a vacuum tube stereo power amplifier widely regarded as a significant achievement in audio engineering for its high performance-to-cost ratio. Designed by David Hafler and Ed Laurent, the amplifier utilized an efficient circuit topology that allowed for high-quality sound reproduction at a price point accessible to the mass market.

During a period when the audio industry was transitioning toward solid-state technology, the ST-70 sustained consumer interest in tube-based amplification; due to its exceptional value and build quality, the unit was frequently referred to in the industry as "the poor man's McIntosh." With over 350,000 units sold by the time production concluded, it remains the most commercially successful vacuum tube power amplifier in history.

A smaller tube amplifier, the 17.5wpc Stereo 35, was introduced in 1963, and was followed the next year by the SCA 35, the company's first integrated (preamp + power amp) tube amplifier. In 1992, an updated version of the Stereo 70, the Stereo 70 II, was produced by Sound Valves for Panor Corporation. Even today, upgraded components, rebuilding kits, and complete tube amplifiers using the basic Stereo 70 design are still in production, and the ST 70 has inspired numerous other amplifier designs, such as Ars-Sonum's Filarmonia SE. Dynaco continued to build both mono and stereo amplifiers until 1977.

The company's final contribution to vacuum tube technology was the massive Mk. VI mono power amplifier of 1976, which produced 120 watts (continuous).

In later years, the company began to produce a line of solid-state audio components, commencing in 1966 with the introduction of the Stereo 120 power amplifier (60 wpc). Because of early problems involving circuit, power supply, and transistor failures, the ST 120 was not as popular as earlier Dynaco tube amplifiers. Numerous small circuit changes were introduced by Dynaco over the years in an attempt to improve the stability and reliability of the ST 120, without much success. With the PAT-4 preamplifier in 1967, the company affirmed its ability to design reliable solid state equipment at an affordable price. In 1969 the Dynaquad 4-channel matrix decoder system was introduced, helping to start the quadrophonic sound craze. In the 1970s, the Stereo 400 was developed and marketed. This was a high power amplifier at 200 watts per channel that offered automatic protection circuitry to prevent electrical destruction of the loudspeaker. The FM-5 tuner was offered as was the SCA-80 integrated amplifier in the early 1970s time line. Dynaco's solid-state kits were different from the popular Heathkit products (and Dynaco's own vacuum tube kits) because of their preassembled circuit boards. These boards were wired at the factory, tested and packaged with the unassembled chassis. It remained only for the consumer to attach the switches and controls to the chassis pieces, assemble the chassis and power supply, and solder connecting wires to the circuit boards. This saved considerable time and reduced error in assembly.

Dynaco also distributed the famous SEAS 'A-Series' of bookshelf loudspeakers that were manufactured in Denmark, using input from Dynaco's David Hafler and SEAS's Ragnar Lian. The A-Series were marketed between from 1970 until Dynaco's demise in the 1980s. The Dynaco A-25 model proved to be extremely successful, selling between 600,000 and 1,000,000 units. A modified aperiodic bass reflex design using SEAS speakers in a handsome wood cabinet, the A-25 sold for $79.95 each in 1969 making it competitive with much more expensive loudspeakers. The patented aperiodic (essentially non-resonant) woofer design utilized a highly damped vent instead of a reflex port, whose acoustic resistance is very carefully controlled. The resistant venting action lowered the "Q" of the system and reduced impedance variation near resonance in the A-Series speakers. Dynaco followed the A-25 with the slightly larger A-35, which featured a dual-chambered, non-vented design in a walnut-veneered cabinet with even greater transparency and fidelity. Over time, Dynaco marketed a wide range of loudspeakers, ranging from the small A-10 model to the floor standing A-50 series. After some 30 years, these loudspeakers still command good prices in markets such as eBay, and are a testimonial to their quality.

Concurrent with A-25 production, Dynaco introduced the QD-1 speaker adapter which synthesized 4-channel sound from the stereo amplifier output. This "Dynaco patent" required a single resistor and a threeway potentiometer for the two rear speakers, generating phase difference signals for a feeling of ambience. The system worked best when the stereo sound had been recorded via two bidirectional microphones on the same spot. When microphone set-up changed to the use of multiple directional microphones and multitrack tape recording and postprocessing (i.c. in the CD era), the QD-1 was less effective.

Dynaco became a wholly owned subsidiary of Tyco, Inc. in 1969. David Hafler remained with the company a few years longer, but left in 1974 to join Ortofon, manufacturer of high-end phono cartridges. In 1977, Hafler founded the Hafler Company, continuing the tradition of high quality but inexpensive kits and assembled hi-fi gear.

In the late 1970s, Dynaco released a short-lived set of new loudspeakers developed by Ed Laurent, the Phase III. The speakers were well regarded by the audiophile community, but their introduction was apparently too late to make any strong impression in the marketplace, and Ed Laurent left shortly afterward to join SEAS Corporation. After Dynaco closed its USA operations, its former Canadian subsidiary released the Dynaco A-150, A-250, and A-350 speakers, all manufactured in Canton, Massachusetts. Critical reviews of the new audio speakers were not favorable, and they disappeared from the market in the mid-1980s.

== Sale of company ==
Dynaco was acquired by ESS Labs, LLC in 1979; the Dynaco division was closed in 1980 and its assets acquired by Stereo Cost Cutters (later called Sound Values and Sound Valves).

In 1991 the Pan Orient Corporation (later Panor Corporation) acquired the Dynaco trademark, and in 1993 began marketing electronic audio components with the Dynaco brand. Panor introduced some new products, such as the Stereo 70 II. Panor/Dynaco's most ambitious stereo tube amplifier was the Stereo 160, a 75 wpc, all-tube stereo power amplifier with switchable pentode/triode modes, adjustable tube bias potentiometers, and 6550 output tubes.

While Panor owns the Dynaco brand name and trademark, there is no longer any direct connection with the company founded by David Hafler.

As of 01/30/2026 Dynakit, LLC now owns the Dynaco US trademark.

== Dynaco tube equipment ==
Dynaco introduced tube audio amplifiers, tuners, and preamplifiers between 1955 and 1976.

Model	Type	Channels (Power)	Year Introduced
Dynaco Mark II	Power Amp	Mono (50 watts)	1955
Dynaco PAM-1	Preamp	Mono	1957
Dynaco Mark III	Power Amp	Mono (60 watts)	1957
Dynaco Stereo 70	Power Amp	Stereo (35 wpc)	1959
Dynaco PAS-2	Preamp	Stereo	1960
Dynaco Mark IV	Power Amp	Mono (40 watts)	1960
Dynaco FM-1	FM tuner	Mono	1961
Dynaco Stereo 35	Power Amp	Stereo (17.5 wpc)	1963
Dynaco SCA-35	Integrated Amp	Stereo (17.5 wpc)	1964
Dynaco FM-3	FM tuner	Stereo	1964
Dynaco PAS-3X	Preamp	Stereo	1966
Dynaco Mark VI	Power Amp	Mono (120 watts)	1976
