= Mullard Circuits for Audio Amplifiers =

Mullard Circuits for Audio Amplifiers is a famous book by the Technical Services Department of Mullard Ltd, a British valve manufacturing company. First published in 1959 and then reprinted several times it contained a number of designs by Mullard engineers for high quality audio amplifiers, which were to be used by amateur constructors as well as by manufacturers as the basis for many products that formed part of the high fidelity audio movement in Britain in the 1960s.

Particularly iconic designs were the Mullard 5-10 and the Mullard 5-20, ten and twenty watt power amplifiers. Circuits for preamplifiers with tone controls and tape recorder amplifiers were also included, along with information regarding record and tape equalisation standards.

== See also ==
- National Valve Museum page
- Scan of Mullard Circuits for Audio Amplifiers, 1963, Archive.org
