= Error amplifier (electronics) =

Electronic component

Internal structure

Application

An error amplifier is an electronic component that amplifies the difference between its two inputs. If one input is a reference signal, this difference can be considered the error in the other.

The error amplifier is usually used with feedback loops owing to its self-correcting mechanism. A common application is in feedback unidirectional voltage control circuits, where the sampled output voltage of the circuit under control is fed back and compared to a stable reference voltage. Any difference between the two generates a compensating error voltage which tends to move the output voltage towards the design specification.

== Devices ==
- Discrete Transistors
- Operational amplifiers

== Applications ==
- Regulated power supply
- D.C Power Amplifiers
- Measurement Equipment
- Servomechanisms

== See also ==
- Differential amplifier
