= 6SN7 =

Dual low-frequency, medium-gain octal triode vacuum tube

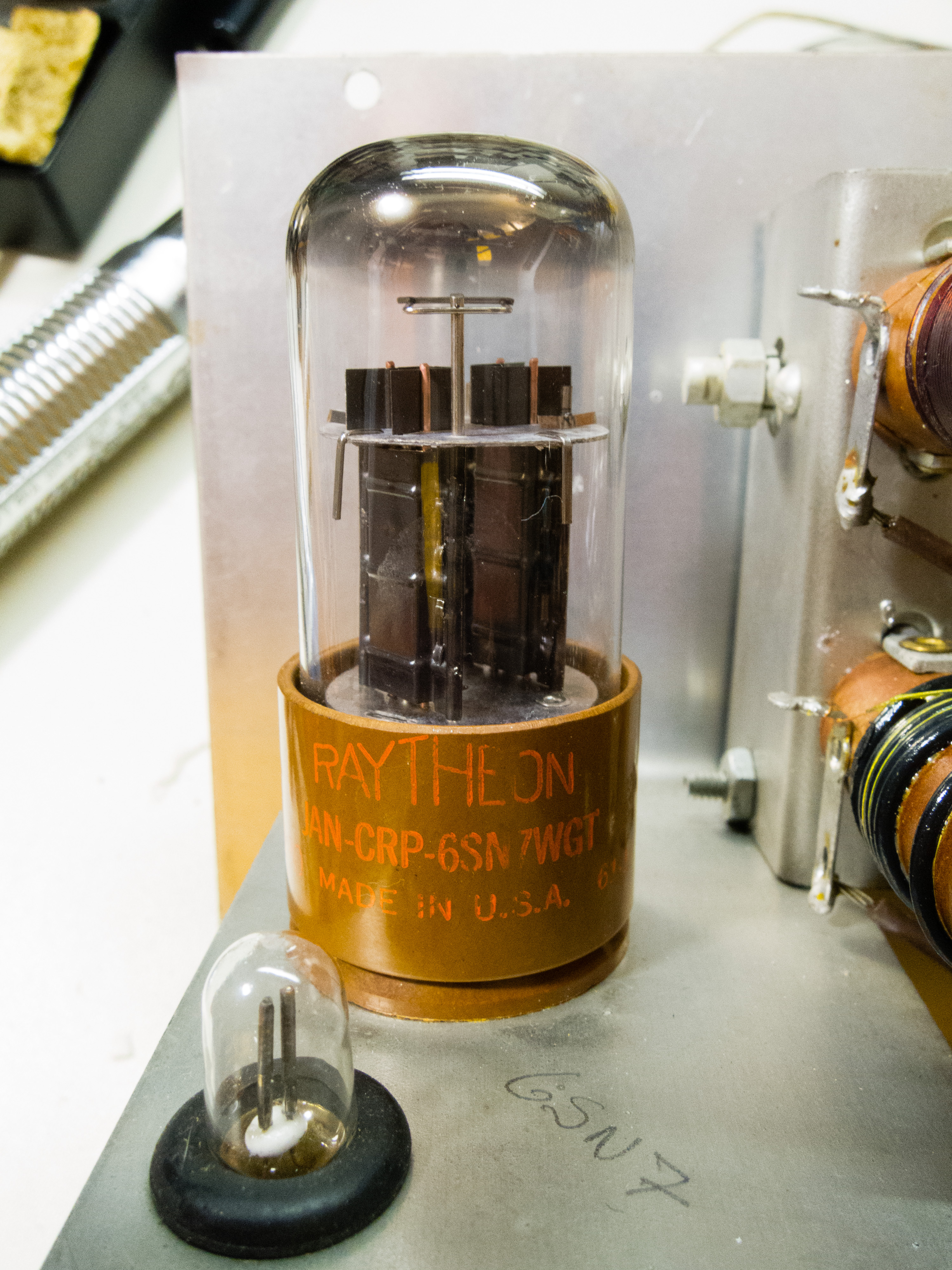
6SN7 vacuum tube dual triode made by Raytheon

6SN7 is a dual triode vacuum tube with an eight-pin octal base. It provides a medium gain (20 dB). The 6SN7 is basically two 6J5 triodes in one envelope.

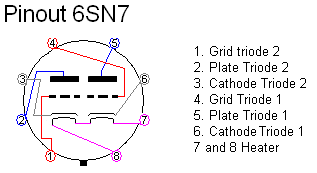

== History ==
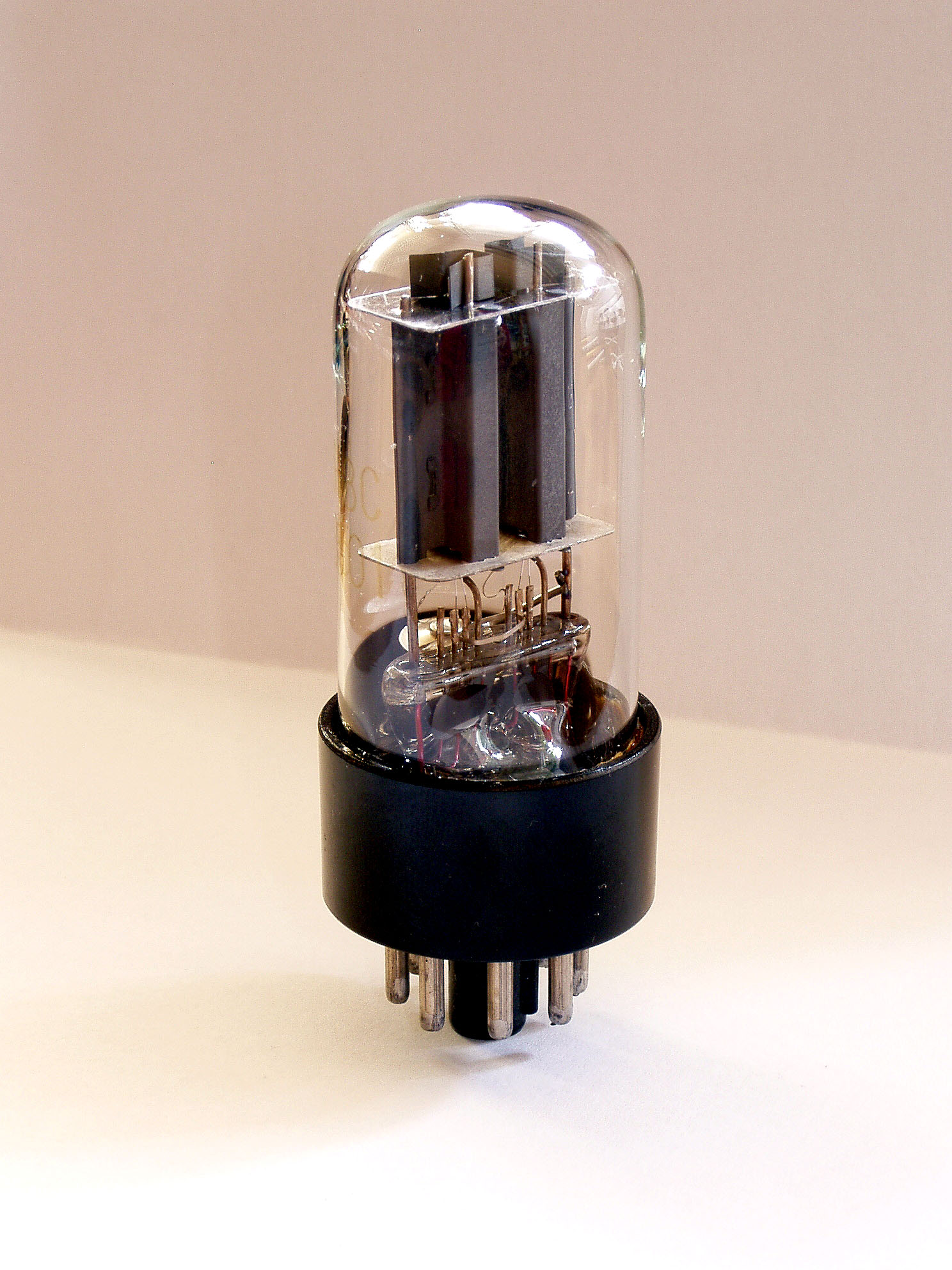
Soviet version 6Н8С

The 6SN7 was originally released in 1939. It was officially registered in 1941 by RCA and Sylvania as the glass-cased 6SN7GT, originally listed on page 235 of RCA's 1940 RC-14 Receiving Tube Manual, in the Recently Added section, as: 6SN7-GT. Although the 6S-series tubes are often metal-cased, there was never a metal-envelope 6SN7 (there being no pin available to connect the metal shield); there were, however, a few glass-envelope tubes with a metal band, such as the 6SN7A developed during World War II - slightly improved in some respects but the metal band was prone to splitting.

Numerous variations on the 6SN7 type have been offered over the years, including:

- 7N7 (Sylvania 1940, short-lived loktal-base version),
- 1633 (RCA 1941, also for 26-V radios),
- 12SX7 (RCA 1946, intended for use in 12-volt aircraft electronics),
- 5692 (RCA 1948, a super-premium version - not exactly identical - with guaranteed 10,000-hour lifetime),
- 6Н8С (Cyrillic, Soviet version, c. 1950, in Latin letters: 6N8S);
- 6SN7 DDR, 6Н8М, E1606 (=CV278), OSW3129 versions with different/larger glass envelopes;
- 6042 (1951, another 1633 type), and
- 6180 (1952)
- 6SN7W (1956; a more rugged military version, glass envelope with metal band)

The American military designator for the 6SN7GA is VT-231. The British called it CV1988. European designations include the 1942 ECC32 (not an exact equivalent), 13D2 and B65.

The 6SN7 has a 6.3 V 600 mA heater/filament. The 12-volt 300 mA filament equivalent is the 12SN7GT or 12SN7GTA. The 14N7 is the Loktal version of the 12SN7GT. There was also a comparatively rare 8V 8SN7 for 450 mA series-string TV sets) and 25 Volt/0.15 Amp heater version: 25SN7GT.

== Related types ==
The 1937 6F8G was also an octal-based double triode with essentially the same characteristics as the 6SN7 (or two 6J5's), but in a 'Coke Bottle' large (Outline ST-12) glass envelope with a different pin arrangement and utilising a top cap connection for the first triode's grid (making pin 1 available for a metal shield).

== 6J5 ==
The 6J5, first registered in June 1937, and 6J5GT (registered April 1938; British version L63) were octal single triodes with identical characteristics to one half of a 6SN7. Other equivalents to the 6J5 include:

- VT-94, 6C2, 6J5M, 38565J;
- military versions: CV1933, 10E/11448 and CV1934;
- Loktal base version: 7A4 (military name: CV1770), and
- 12.6 V heater version: 12J5.

They in turn were successors to the 1935 RCA 6C5 and 1938 6P5G.

== Successors to the 6SN7 ==
The 1954 6CG7 and 6FQ7 are electrically equivalent to the 6SN7, with nine-pin miniature ("Noval") base (RCA, 1951), also made as an 8.4V 450mA series string heater type as the 8CG7.

In contrast to what some sources claim, the ECC40 with Rimlock base and introduced by Philips in 1948 cannot be considered a successor to the 6SN7 as the electrical characteristics are too different.

The 1946 miniature 12AU7/ECC82, with similar, but not identical, electrical characteristics to the 6SN7 and ECC32, and a filament usable on either 6.3V or 12.6V supplies, is more widely used than the 6CG7/6FQ7.

== Usage ==
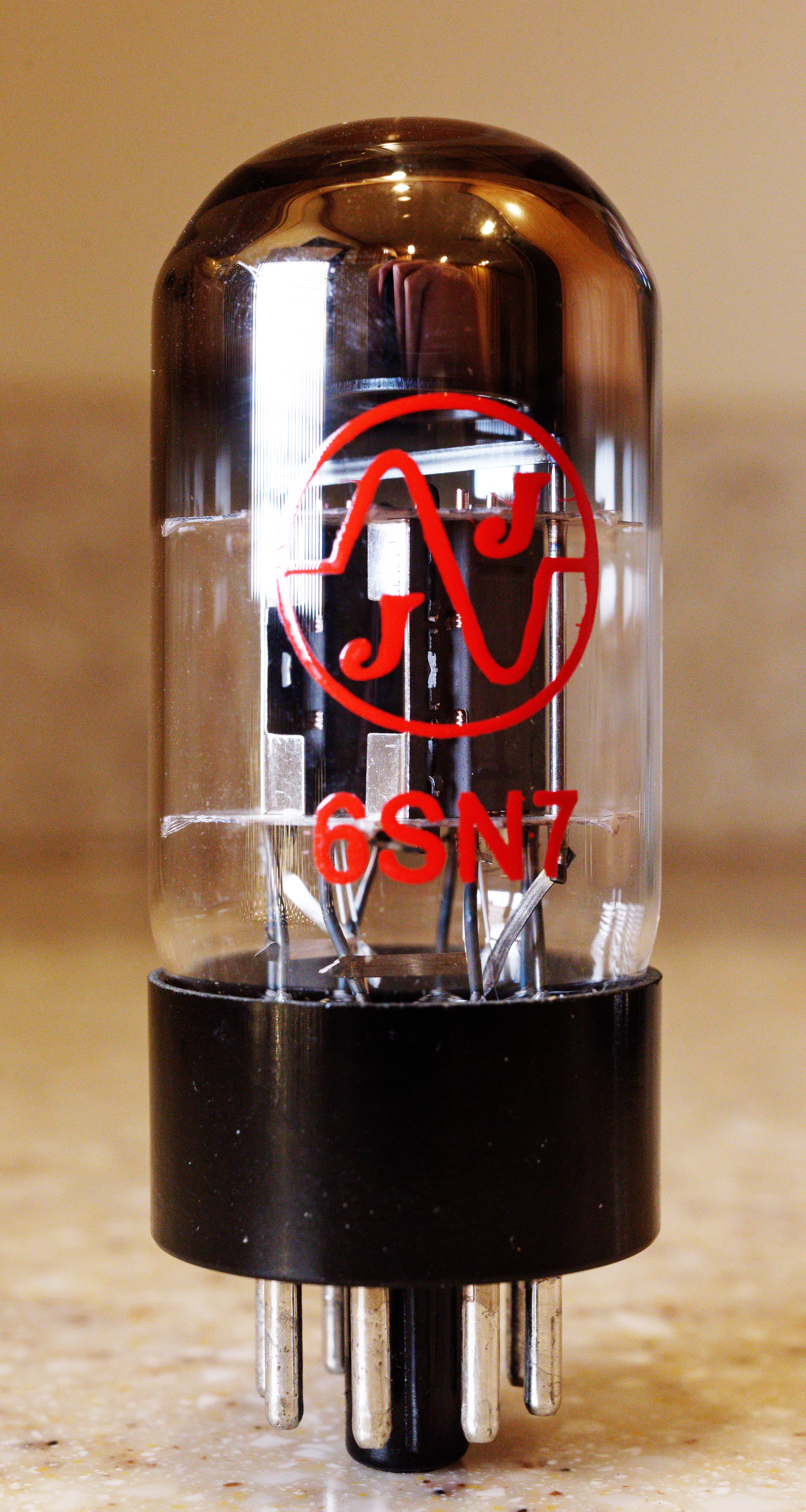
6SN7 by JJ Electronic

The 6SN7 was used as an audio amplifier in the 1940-1955 period, usually in the driver stages of power amps. The designer of the famous Williamson amplifier, one of the first true high-fidelity designs, suggested use of the 6SN7 (or B65) in his 1949 revision since it is similar to the original circuit's L63 (=6J5) British single triodes, four of which were used in each channel of his 1947 circuit.

The 6SN7 was one of the most important components of the first programmable electronic digital computer, the ENIAC, which contained several thousand of the tubes. The SAGE computer systems used hundreds of 5692s as flip-flops.

With the advent of television, the 6SN7 was well suited for use as a vertical-deflection amplifier. As screen sizes became larger, voltage and power headroom became insufficient. To address this, uprated versions with higher peak voltage and power ratings were introduced. The GE 6SN7GTA (GE, 1950) had anode dissipation uprated to 5.0 watts. The 1954 GE 6SN7GTB also had controlled heater warmup time, better for series heater strings.

The 6SN7 was considered to be obsolete by the 1960s, replaced by the 12AU7, and became almost unobtainable. With the introduction of semiconductor electronics, vacuum tubes of all types ceased to be manufactured by the major producers. A small demand for vacuum tubes in guitar amplifiers and very expensive high-fidelity equipment remained. As existing stocks ran out, factories in eastern Europe and China started to manufacture the 6SN7, and higher-gain 6SL7. As of 2019, 6SN7s and 6SL7s are still manufactured in Russia and by JJ Electronic, and are widely available.

== See also ==
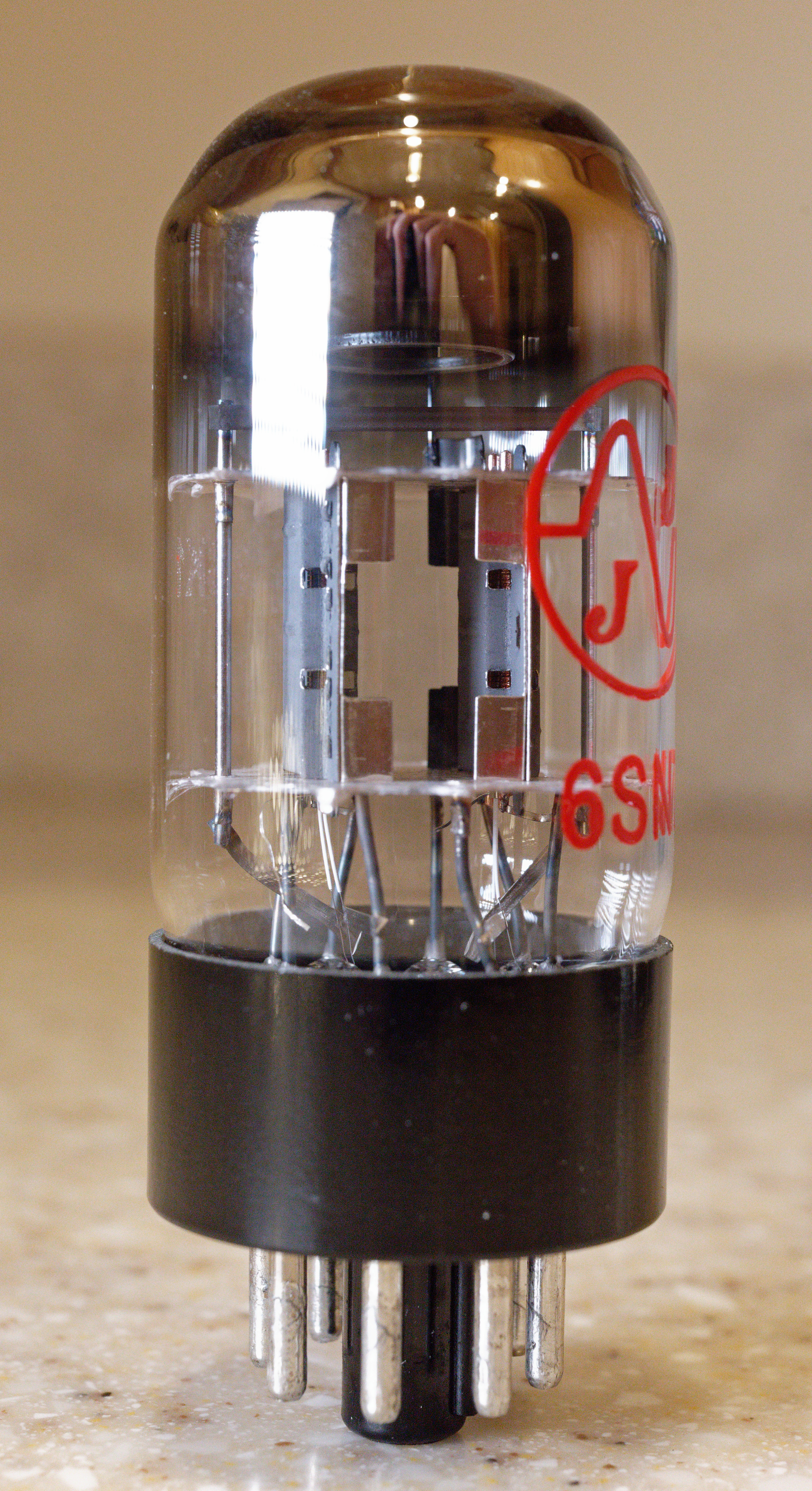
Dual triodes

- List of vacuum tubes
- 12AT7
- 12AU7
- 12AX7
