= John Linsley Hood =

English electronics engineer and designer of audio components

John Laurence Linsley-Hood (9 February 1925 in Wandsworth, London – 11 March 2004 in Taunton, Somerset) was an English electronics engineer and designer of audio components.

He was educated at Reading School, Acton Polytechnic, the Royal Technical College (Glasgow) and after World War Two, at Reading University. In 1942 Linsley-Hood joined the G.E.C. Research Laboratories at Wembley, working on magnetron development as junior member of a team. Joining the RAF aircrew in 1943, he was transferred to work on radar, then subsequently worked with T.R.E. (Malvern) overseas. After returning to university, Linsley-Hood joined the Windscale Research Laboratories of the Atomic Energy Authority. He was in charge of the electronics team in the Research Laboratories of British Cellophane Ltd. from 1954.

John Linsley-Hood is best remembered by hi-fi enthusiasts for his "Simple Class A Amplifier", which he developed to provide a good-quality performance comparable to that of the classic Williamson amplifier. The design was published in Wireless World in 1969 (April 1969 issue, p. 148), and later updated in 1996.

Linsley-Hood wrote for a number of magazines and published books on schematics for audio components, including:

- The Art of Linear Electronics (Oxford, Butterworth-Heinemann, 1993)
- Audio Electronics (Oxford, Newnes, 1995)
- Valve and Transistor Audio Amplifiers (Oxford, Newnes, 1997)
