= Fritz Langford-Smith =

Australian electrical engineer (1904–1966)

- Born: 29 June 1904; Sydney
- Died: 3 December 1966 (aged 62); Sydney
- Occupations: Electrical Engineer, author, editor
- Spouse: Dulcie Elizabeth Langford-Smith
- Writing career
- Genres: Handbook, Science book, Scientific paper
- Notable works: Radiotron Designer's Handbook, Radiotronics (editor)

Fritz Langford-Smith (29 June 1904 – 3 December 1966) was an Australian electrical engineer. He was the author of the classic engineering reference Radiotron Designer's Handbook (RDH). He was heavily involved in the science of communication and engineering research in England and in Australia. He was a long-term editor of the journal Radiotronics (1935–1950).

== Education and career ==
Langford-Smith received a Bachelor of Science (BSc) from the University of Sydney in 1926. In 1928, he received a Bachelor of Engineering (BE) also from the university.

From 1929 to 1932, he was an engineer at Cosmos Lamp Works in the UK. From 1932 to 1956, he worked as an engineer at AWA. From 1956 to 1963, he was an engineer with the English Electrical Co. in the UK.

From 1935 to 1950 he was editor of Radiotronics.

== Radiotron Designer's Handbook ==
Fritz Langford-Smith was the author of Radiotron Designer's Handbook (or Radio Designer's Handbook) which was often called the "bible" of vacuum tubes and their circuits due to its sheer size and complete scope It was also sometimes known as "the big red book" due to its bright-red leatherette cover. It was first published 1934 and revised until 1967.

== Honorifics ==
Honorary member of the Audio Engineering Society in 1959 for his Radiotron Designer's Handbook for "its importance in the education of a generation of audio engineers."

== Works ==
- Tone compensation in broadcast receivers. Radio Review of Australia, 4 (7) (July 1936), 6–12.
- Power output systems (Abstract). Radio Review of Australia, 4 (12) (December 1936), 18.
- The relationship between the power output stage and the loudspeaker. World Radio Convention. Proceedings. (Sydney, 1938), paper no. 24; A.W.A. Technical Review, 4 (1939), 199–223.
- The Radiotron Designer's Handbook:
  - 1st edition. Sydney: Amalgamated Wireless Valve Co./Harrison, New Jersey, USA: Radio Corporation of America, 1934.
  - 2nd edition. Sydney: Amalgamated Wireless Valve Co./Harrison, New Jersey, USA: Radio Corporation of America, 1935. (58 pages)
  - Langford-Smith, Fritz, ed. (November 1941) [1940]. Radiotron Designer's Handbook (PDF) (4th impression, 3rd ed.). Sydney, Australia / Harrison, New Jersey, USA: Wireless Press for AWA / RCA. Archived (PDF) from the original on 2021-02-03. (352 pages) (Also published as Radio Designer's Handbook. London: Wireless World, 1940.)
  - Langford-Smith, Fritz, ed. (January 1960) [1953, 1952, 1940, 1935, 1934]. Radiotron Designer's Handbook (PDF) (4 ed.). Sydney, Australia / Harrison, New Jersey, USA: Wireless Press for AWA / RCA, Electron Tube Division. Archived (PDF) from the original on 2021-07-08.
