= Electronics World =

- Editor: Casey Porter
- Categories: Science and technology magazines
- Frequency: 10 issues per Year
- Circulation: Print:7032 Digital:14,462 (2023)
- First issue: 1913
- Company: Datateam Business Media Ltd
- Country: United Kingdom
- Based in: Maidstone, Kent
- Language: English
- Website: www.electronicsworld.co.uk
- ISSN: 0959-8332

Electronics World (Wireless World, founded in 1913, and in October 1983 renamed Electronics & Wireless World) is a technical magazine published by Datateam Business Media Ltd that covers electronics and RF engineering and is aimed at professional design engineers. It is produced monthly in print and digital formats.

The editorial content of Electronics World covers the full range of electronics and RF industry activities including technology, systems, components, design, development tools, software, networking, communications tools and instrumentation. It encompasses a range of issues in the electronics and RF industry, from design through to product implementation. The features are contributed by engineers and academics in the electronics industry.

The circulation is split between electronic design engineers, senior managers, and R&D professionals within areas such as communications, manufacturing, education and training, IT, medical, power, oil and gas.

== History ==
The Marconi Company published the first issue of the journal The Marconigraph in April 1911. This monthly magazine was the first significant journal dedicated to wireless communication, and it circulated largely among Marconi engineers and operators.

In April 1913, after two years and 24 issues, The Marconigraph was superseded by The Wireless World. An Illustrated Monthly Magazine for all interested in Wireless Telegraphy and Telephony as its first issue was sold on news-stands.

Publication of Wireless World continued uninterrupted throughout World War I, and from 4 April 1920 (vol. 8 no. 1) publication frequency was increased to fortnightly

From 1 April 1922 it became known as The Wireless World and Radio Review following a merger with The Radio Review, a monthly journal that had first been published in London in October 1919. With the same issue, publication frequency of Wireless World became weekly.

It was also aimed at home constructors, publishing articles on building radio receivers and, after the BBC started regular 405-line TV programmes from Alexandra Palace in 1936, complete details on building your own TV set - including the winding of the high-voltage CRT deflector coils (not a task for the faint hearted). A similar series was published after 1945 utilising the then ubiquitous EF50 RF pentode amplifier valve (tube).

With the outbreak of World War II and the expected shortages of paper and other resources, the publication reverted to being monthly, a frequency that it still retains to this day.

The title was changed in September 1984 to Electronics and Wireless World, and from January 1996 (vol 102, no. 1718), to Electronics World.

A sister publication was Wireless Engineer which was more of a learned journal than a popular magazine, featuring high quality, technical articles.

== Notable articles ==
=== Geosynchronous satellites ===
In Wireless World 's October 1945 issue, Arthur C. Clarke (then of The British Interplanetary Society) published a now-famous article, "Extra Terrestrial Relays", which foresaw the coming of communications satellites in synchronous orbit around the Earth. Clarke pointed out that three satellites in the equatorial plane orbit at an altitude of 36,000 km, spaced 120 degrees apart, could provide global communications. The altitude is crucial as there a satellite rotates at the same angular velocity as the surface of the Earth, and therefore remains above a particular point on its surface – that is, it is geostationary. The article is now seen as the origin of modern satellite communications, and the geostationary earth orbit is sometimes referred to as Clarke's Orbit.

=== Audio and electronic design ===
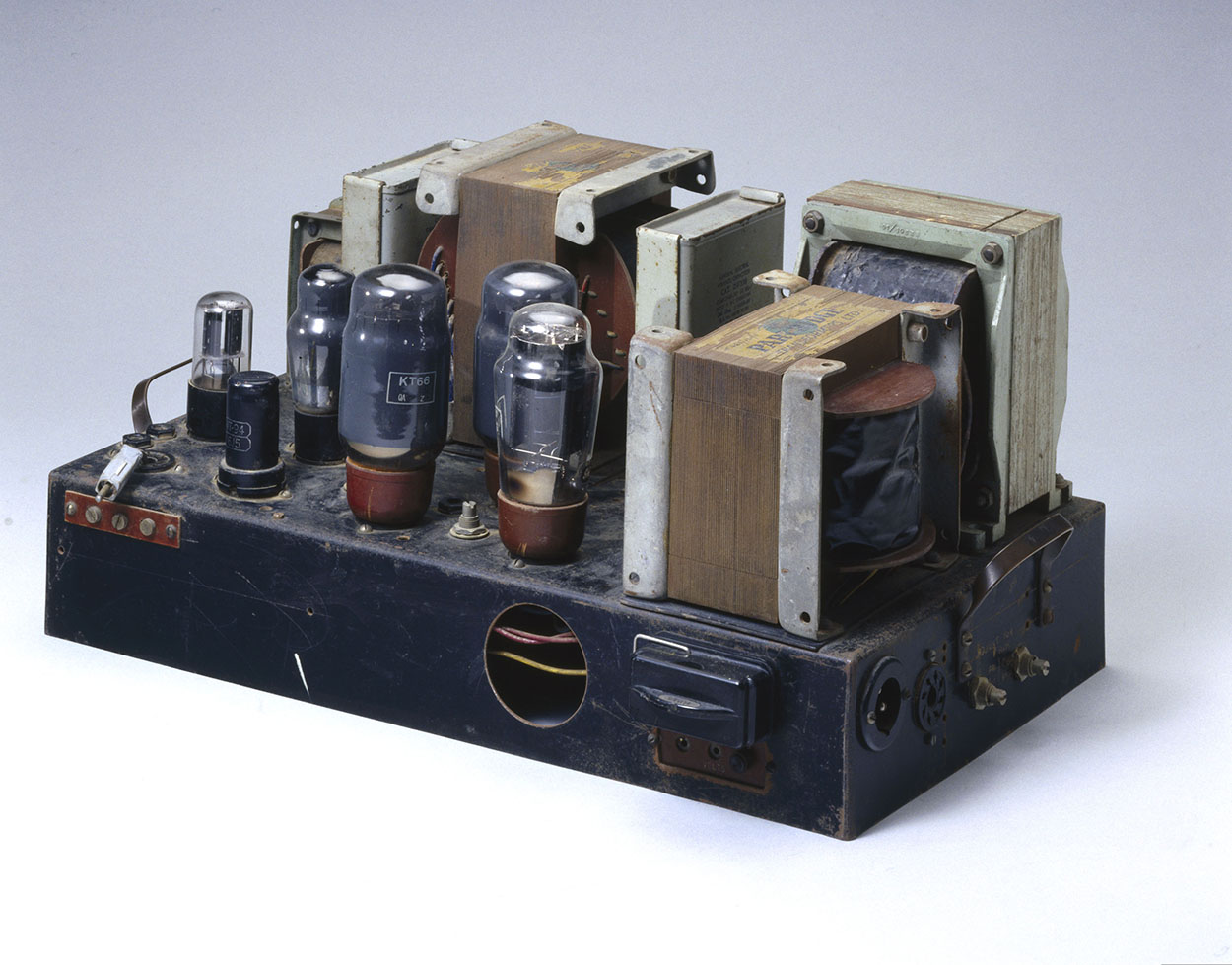
A 1949 Williamson amplifier built to the design in Wireless World.

For decades, Wireless World was a place where pioneers in audio and electronic design shared ideas. In 1947-49, it published articles on building what became the famous "Williamson amplifier" by D.T.N Williamson - using a pair of triode-connected KT66 kinkless power tetrodes (very similar to the American 6L6) in push-pull to give 15 watts output. In 1952 it made the first public announcement of the Baxandall tone control circuit, a design now employed in millions of hi-fi systems including amplifiers and effects for musical instruments. In 1955 it published the design of the popular Mullard 5-10 audio amplifier using two EL84 power pentodes in ultra-linear push-pull configuration. In the 1960s and 1970s there were many further articles on advances in audio and electronic design, notably all-transistor designs including the 'Tobey-Dinsdale Amplifier' and the 'Linsley Hood' power amplifier. In the December 1975 edition an article described “feed-forward” error correction for audio amplifiers as embodied in the legendary QUAD 405 current dumping power amplifier designed by Peter Walker and M. P. Albinson. In 1975/6 Wireless World published the design of a decoder of broadcast TV Teletext information before the first commercial decoder became available. Later it published regular columns of brief Circuit Ideas.

=== Computers ===
In the August to December 1967 editions a series, Wireless World Digital Computer by Brian Crank, was published. It described how to build a "very" simple binary computer at home. It was constructed entirely from "reject" transistors (functional, but not meeting all specifications, consequently sold cheaply), and was intended for teaching the basic principles of computer operation.

In 1977 a series of articles was published based on the design of the NASCOM 1 computer.

In 1979 the magazine published a design by John Adams for a dual-processor desktop computer which included a novel high-level programming language. Entitled "A scientific computer", it was marketed as the PSI Comp 80 in kit form by the company Powertran.

== Contributors ==
Contributors included M.G. Scroggie, who contributed articles of an educational nature on subjects such as applied mathematics and electronic theory using the pen name "Cathode Ray". "Free Grid" was the pseudonym of Norman Preston Vincer-Minter (1897–1964), a classicist and ex-naval wireless operator who specialised in deflating pomposity with his biting wit. Amongst the early editors was W.T. Cocking (designer of the WW television sets); the last six editors were Tom Ivall, Philip Darrington, Frank Ogden, Martin Eccles, Phil Reed and Svetlana "Stella" Josifovska, who edited the publication for 20 years from 2004 to August 2024. Casey Porter took over the editor role from Stella.

On pages 232 and 233 of the April 1961 Golden Jubilee issue, regular contributor "Free Grid" speculates what the next 50 years might hold and predicts that "long before our centenary year ... all positions now sacred to the male will have been taken over by women." He went on to make certain remarks in jest about the "editress of 2011" that would not be acceptable today.

Pat Hawker MBE, also well known for the "Technical Topics" feature he authored for exactly 50 years in the Radio Society of Great Britain's "Radio Communication" or "RadCom" magazine, contributed the regular column "World of Amateur Radio" from May 1969 to April 1982.

An occasional contributor, Ivor Catt, sparked controversy with an article on electromagnetism in December 1978 by challenging the validity of Maxwell's displacement current. This spawned an exchange of letters to the editor which lasted for years.

== Online ==
The website contains a regular blog spot, whitepapers, webinars, a directory listing, guest forums, and events listings. All news is also updated on Twitter, LinkedIn, Facebook and Google+.
