= David Hafler =

American audio engineer (1919–2003)

- Born: February 7, 1919; West Philadelphia, Pennsylvania, US
- Died: May 25, 2003 (aged 84); Philadelphia, Pennsylvania, US
- Education: University of Pennsylvania
- Occupation: Audio engineer
- Known for: Co-founder of Dynaco and David Hafler Company
- Spouse: Gertrude Schwinger (m. 1942; died 2001)
- Children: 3

David Hafler (February 7, 1919 – May 25, 2003) was an American audio engineer. He was best known for his work on an improved version of the Williamson amplifier using the ultra-linear circuit of Alan Blumlein.

== Biography ==
In 1950, Hafler founded Acrosound with his colleague Herbert Keroes. This company was primarily in the business of designing and manufacturing transformers for tube amplifiers. Around this time Hafler and Keroes popularized the ultra-linear output-stage for audio amplifiers. However, the partnership did not last.

In 1954 Hafler founded Dynaco with Ed Laurent. Hafler was instrumental in bringing affordable, high-quality audio kits to hobbyists, making his name a household word in the US audio community for many years.

In the 1970s Hafler promoted "passive pseudo-quadraphonics", an inexpensive method of recreating ambient sounds at the rear from ordinary stereophonic recordings. Known as the "Hafler hookup" or "Hafler circuit", this consisted of two similar additional rear speakers, connected in series (typically 8 + 8 or 16 ohms total) between the live feeds to the front speakers. The crosstalk or loss of stereo separation in the front speakers was generally less than 2 dB, while the rear sound level in a typical recorded live performance was about 7 dB below the front, but clearly audible.

The Dynaco QD-1 Quadaptor was based on this idea, adding a variable resistor to control the volume of the rear speakers. This passive method worked fairly well compared to the matrix decoders of the period, which attempted to reconstruct a surround sound field from a two channel recording. It had been observed that ambient sounds in a concert, such as applause or coughs from the audience, are generally received in a non-correlated phase by the stereophonic microphones, while sounds from the musicians are generally in a more or less synchronous phase. Thus, if rear speakers are fed with the difference between the stereo channels, audience noises and echoes from the auditorium can be heard from behind the listener.

In 1977, Hafler founded the David Hafler company in Pennsauken, New Jersey (a Philadelphia suburb). His first two products were the DH-101 preamplifier, followed a few months later by the DH-200 companion power amplifier. Added later was the rugged DH-500 stereo amplifier, which was rated at 255 watts per channel and saw great success in home, studio, and live environments. The amplifiers were notable for their early use of new, more-powerful MOSFETs to enable much lower distortion at higher power, in a very economical fashion. The new designs were less vulnerable to thermal runaway, allowing them to operate reliably at higher power without requiring expensive protective circuitry.

Following the Dynaco business model, these products were available in both kit form and factory assembled. The units were acclaimed for their breakthrough sound quality and exceptional value, and are still highly prized today. Hafler made several different models of amplifiers and preamps over the years. Hafler products were also a foundation for improvements through later upgrades and modifications, installed both by DIY hobbyists and small specialist audio companies.

Hafler sold his company to the Rockford Corporation in 1987. Today, the Hafler company primarily makes products for the professional sound market.

The Hafler brand was purchased by Canadian based Radial Engineering Ltd in 2014. Radial planned to re-launch the Hafler brand of high-fidelity audio products.

Mike Belitz, CEO and President of Ultimate Support, in a venture with Vancouver, B.C. Private Equity Firm, Regimen Partners, have acquired Radial Engineering Ltd. and its diverse catalog of brands that include Primacoustic, Tonebone, Reamp, Hafler, Dynaco, Jensen Transformers and Iso•Max.

David Hafler died from complications of Parkinson's disease in Philadelphia, Pennsylvania, at the age of 84.

== Awards and honors ==
- Hafler was inducted into the Audio Hall of Fame in 1984.
