= Ultra-linear =

Type of electronic circuit

Ultra-linear electronic circuits are those used to couple a tetrode or pentode vacuum-tube (also called "electron-valve") to a load (e.g. to a loudspeaker).

'Ultra-linear' is a special case of 'distributed loading'; a circuit technique patented by Alan Blumlein in 1937 (Patent No. 496,883), although the name 'distributed loading' is probably due to Mullard. In 1938 he applied for the US patent 2218902. The particular advantages of ultra-linear operation, and the name itself, were published by David Hafler and Herbert Keroes in the early 1950s through articles in the magazine "Audio Engineering" from the USA. The special case of 'ultra linear' operation is sometimes confused with the more general principle of distributed loading.

== Operation ==
A pentode or tetrode vacuum-tube (valve) configured as a common-cathode amplifier (where the output signal appears on the plate) may be operated as:

- a pentode or tetrode, in which the screen-grid is connected to a stable DC voltage so there are no signal variations on the screen-grid (i.e. the screen-grid has 0% of the plate's output signal impressed on it), or
- a triode, in which the screen-grid is connected to the plate (i.e. the screen-grid has 100% of the plate's output signal voltage impressed on it), or
- a blend of triode and pentode, in which the screen-grid has a percentage (between 0% and 100%) of the plate's output signal impressed on it. This is the basis of the distributed load circuit, and is usually achieved by incorporating a suitable "tap" on the primary winding of the output transformer that the vacuum-tube (valve) is connected to.

The impression of any portion of the output signal onto the screen-grid can be seen as a form of feedback, which alters the behaviour of the electron stream passing from cathode to anode.

== Advantages ==
By judicious choice of the screen-grid percentage-tap, the benefits of both triode and pentode vacuum-tubes can be realised. Over a very narrow range of percentage-tapping, distortion is found to fall to an unusually low value—sometimes less than for either triode or pentode operation—while power efficiency is only slightly reduced compared with full pentode operation. The optimum percentage-tap to achieve ultra-linear operation depends mainly on the type of valve used; a commonly seen percentage is 43% (of the number of transformer primary turns on the plate-circuit) which applies to the KT88, although many other valve types have optimum values close to this. A value of 20% was recommended for 6V6GTs, although it is possible that this is an impedance ratio, which case it is the same as a 43% turns ratio, because the impedance ratio is the square of the turns ratio. Mullard circuits such as the 5-20 specified either 20% or 43% distributed loading, while LEAK amplifiers after 1954 used variously 25% or 49%, although again it is unclear whether these are turns ratios or impedance ratios.

The characteristics of the circuit which make distributed loading suitable for audio power amplifiers, when compared to a triode, beam tetrode or pentode based amplifier, are:

- The output impedance is lowered to be about half that achieved with a triode.
- Distortion is lowered to approach that achieved with a triode tube, but may be even less for ultra-linear operation.
- The power output is higher than from a triode, approaching that delivered by a pentode.
- The power output is more constant as distributed loading is a combination of a transconductance amplifier and a voltage amplifier.

The distributed load circuit may be applied to either push-pull or single-ended amplifier circuits.

Note that the term 'ultra linear' was expressly reserved only for the condition of optimum tapping point. As Hafler and Keroes wrote: "Our patent claims cover the use of any primary tap in this circuit arrangement. However, we have restricted the use of the term "Ultra Linear" to the conditions where the dynamic plate characteristic curves are most linear".

== Related circuits ==
The "QUAD II" amplifier from QUAD uses a circuit in which the cathode has a portion of the output signal applied to it, and was referred to as "distributed load" by Peter Walker of QUAD. In the United States, McIntosh Laboratories used this technique extensively in their vacuum-tube power amplifiers. Audio Research Corp have also used a similar circuit.
