= LEAK =

LEAK is the brand name for high-fidelity audio equipment made by H. J. Leak & Co. Ltd, of London, England. The company was founded in 1934 by Harold Joseph Leak and was sold to the Rank Organisation in January 1969. During the 1950s and 1960s, the company produced high-quality amplifiers, radio tuners, loudspeakers (the LEAK Sandwich), pickups, tonearms and a turntable. The sale of the business to Rank saw an expanded range of models, and considerable further development of loudspeakers, but Rank was not able to position the brand to counter competition from Japanese electronics manufacturers, so by the late 1970s, electronics and speaker production ceased under the LEAK name.

== Early days ==
The company initially focussed on provision of amplifiers for public address systems and theatres, with only a few staff. Typical designs used were similar to those found in the Partridge Public Address Manuals of the time, which used Osram's DA30 power triodes in push-pull for 45 watts output.

During the latter part of the Second World War, the company started developing amplifiers that made extensive use of negative feedback to achieve very high performance. This approach had been patented by Harold Black of Bell Telephone Laboratories in 1934, and already used before that by Alan Blumlein of EMI, but it was slow to emerge as popular method for controlling amplifier performance.

== Point One ==
In September 1945, the company released the first of the "Point One" series of amplifiers, so named because the total harmonic distortion was 0.1% at rated output. This represented a major leap forward in accepted standards for high-performance amplifiers (with 2% distortion generally considered acceptable at the time). This first "Point One" amplifier was known as the Type 15, and produced 15 watts output, at 0.1% distortion, using push-pull KT66 valves connected as triodes, with 26 dB feedback applied over four stages. The amplifier has a similar topology to the Williamson amplifier published in Wireless World in 1947.

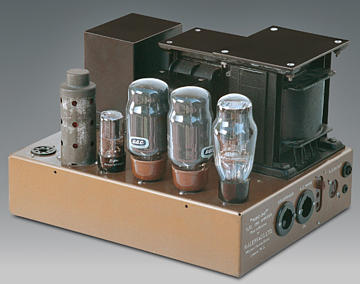
LEAK TL/12 Point One Amplifier

In 1948, the original four-stage circuit was replaced with a three-stage design that was designated the TL/12. This amplifier had the same high performance at reduced cost, and it was responsible for establishing and securing the future of the company as a dominant player in the "hi-fi" boom of the 1950s and 1960s.

Subsequent amplifiers from the company all used the same circuit topology as the TL/12, but took advantage of newer more efficient power valves and the so-called "ultra-linear" connection of the output stage to obtain higher power output with triode-like characteristics. These amplifiers included the TL/10, TL/25, TL/12-Plus, TL/25-Plus, TL/50-Plus, and the Stereo 20, Stereo 50 and Stereo 60.
