= Mullard 5-10 =

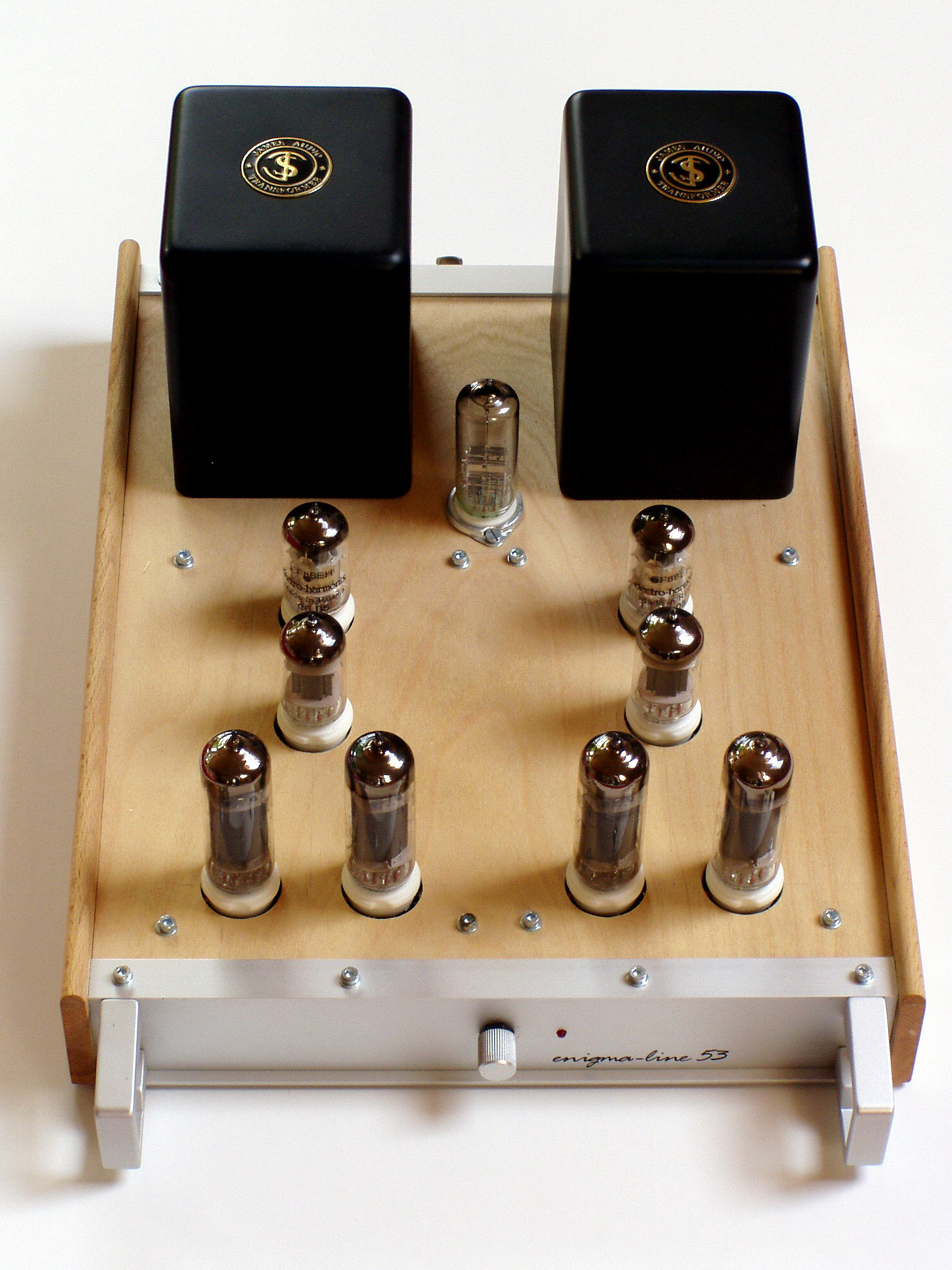
A rebuild Stereo Mullard 5-10 amplifier without power supply unit

The Mullard 5-10 was a circuit for a valve amplifier designed by the British valve company, Mullard in 1954 at the Mullard Applications Research Laboratory (ARL) in Mitcham Surrey UK, part of the New Road factory complex, to take advantage of their particular products. The circuit was first published in Practical Wireless magazine.

The amplifier featured five valves and an output of 10 watts - hence '5-10'. Of those valves, one was a full-wave rectifier (an EZ80 or EZ81), one was a pre-amplifier pentode EF86 and one a double-triode ECC83 as phase splitter. The power amplification was handled by a pair of EL84 working in push-pull configuration.

The frequency response of the circuit was from 40Hz to 20,000Hz with less than 0.2% THD.

In 1959 Mullard published its famous booklet "Mullard Circuits for Audio Amplifiers" covering a range of amplifier and pre-amplifier circuits using valves developed within the Receiving Valve Development Department at the New Road factory.

The circuit design of the Mullard 5–10, together with the recommended Partridge output transformers, was famous for its unique sound reproduction and many variations of this amplifier (including Mullard's own 20-watt version, the Mullard 5-20 using the EL34) were in widespread use until the end of the valve era; similar designs are still manufactured as expensive equipment for valve audiophiles.
