= 6N14P =

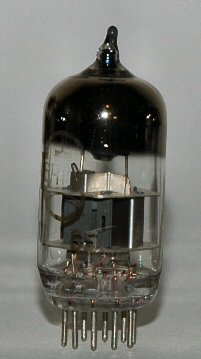
6N14P vacuum tube, USSR (Reflektor) 1965

The 6N14P (Russian: 6Н14П) is a miniature Russian-made medium gain dual-triode vacuum tube used in radio equipment. It serves as a low-noise cascode amplifier at HF through VHF frequencies.

The construction of the tube is asymmetrical, with the control grid of the first triode section (pin no. 2) being internally connected to the internal RF shielding plate, thereby making the first section more suitable for common grid operation. It is a direct equivalent of ECC84 and 6CW7 vacuum tubes.

== Basic data ==
Uf = 6.3V, If = 350 mA uM = 25 Ia = 10.5 mA S = 6.8 mA/V Pa = 1.5 W

== History of use ==
In the Soviet Union the 6N14P was used in the tuner section of some commercial television sets as the cascode RF front-end amplifier stage, as well as in special equipment, and to a lesser extent in more expensive FM receivers and television sets in the 1960s. However, the majority of medium and low-grade Soviet-produced FM radios used the more general-purpose 6N3P (2C51) vacuum tube, as the OIRT FM band used in the USSR was of a lower frequency (65.8 to 74 MHz) and allowed for less stringent noise figure requirements for receiver components compared to the higher frequency Western FM broadcast band (87.5-108 MHz) used in most of the rest of the world.

Currently, like many other vacuum tubes, the 6N14P is used by DIY audio enthusiasts.

== See also ==
- Russian tube designations
- 6N3P
- 6DJ8
- 6N24P
