= Mullard =

British manufacturer of electronic components

- Industry: Electronics
- Founded: 1920
- Founder: Stanley R. Mullard
- Headquarters: United Kingdom
- Products: Electronic Components; Transistors; Vacuum Tubes
- Parent: Philips

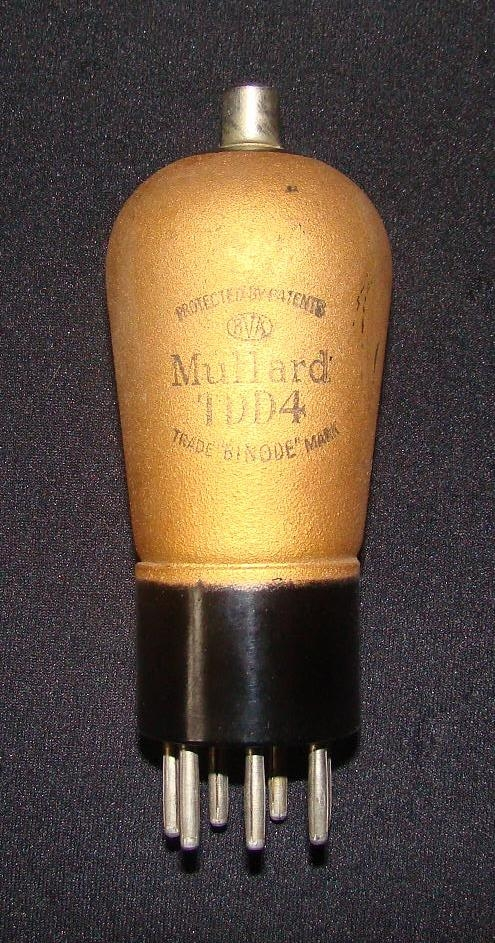
A Mullard TDD4 valve. The gold spray coating served no purpose other than to hide the blackened interior, as Mullard valves were still manufactured using the azide process, long abandoned by other makers.

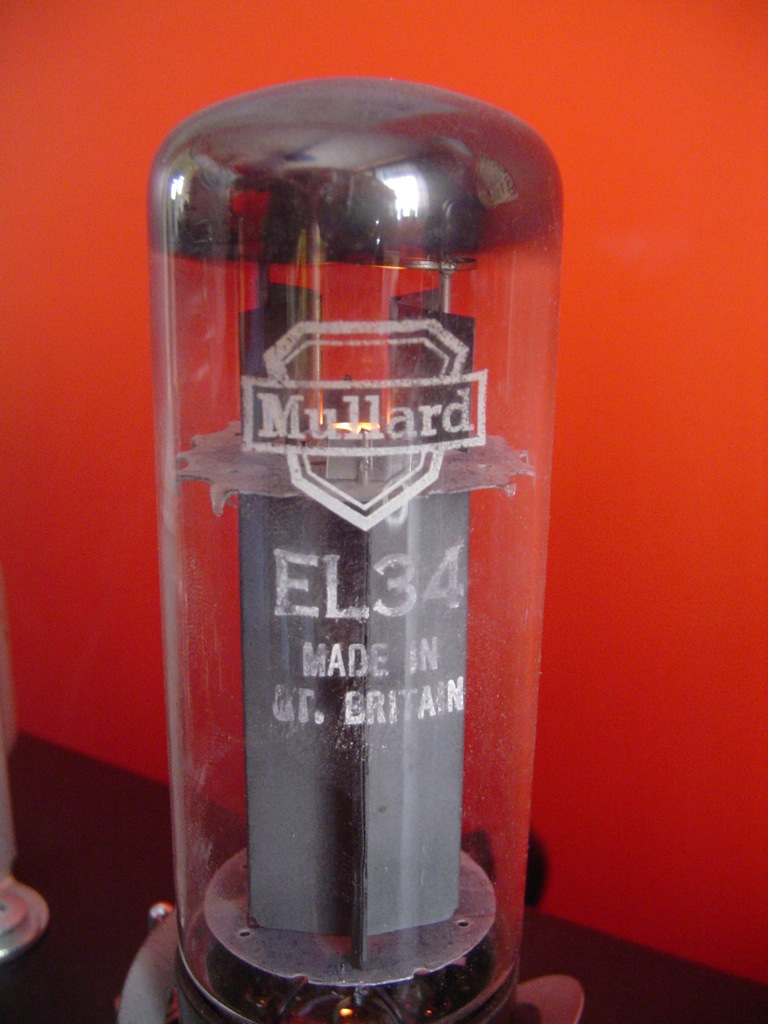
A Mullard EL34 power pentode

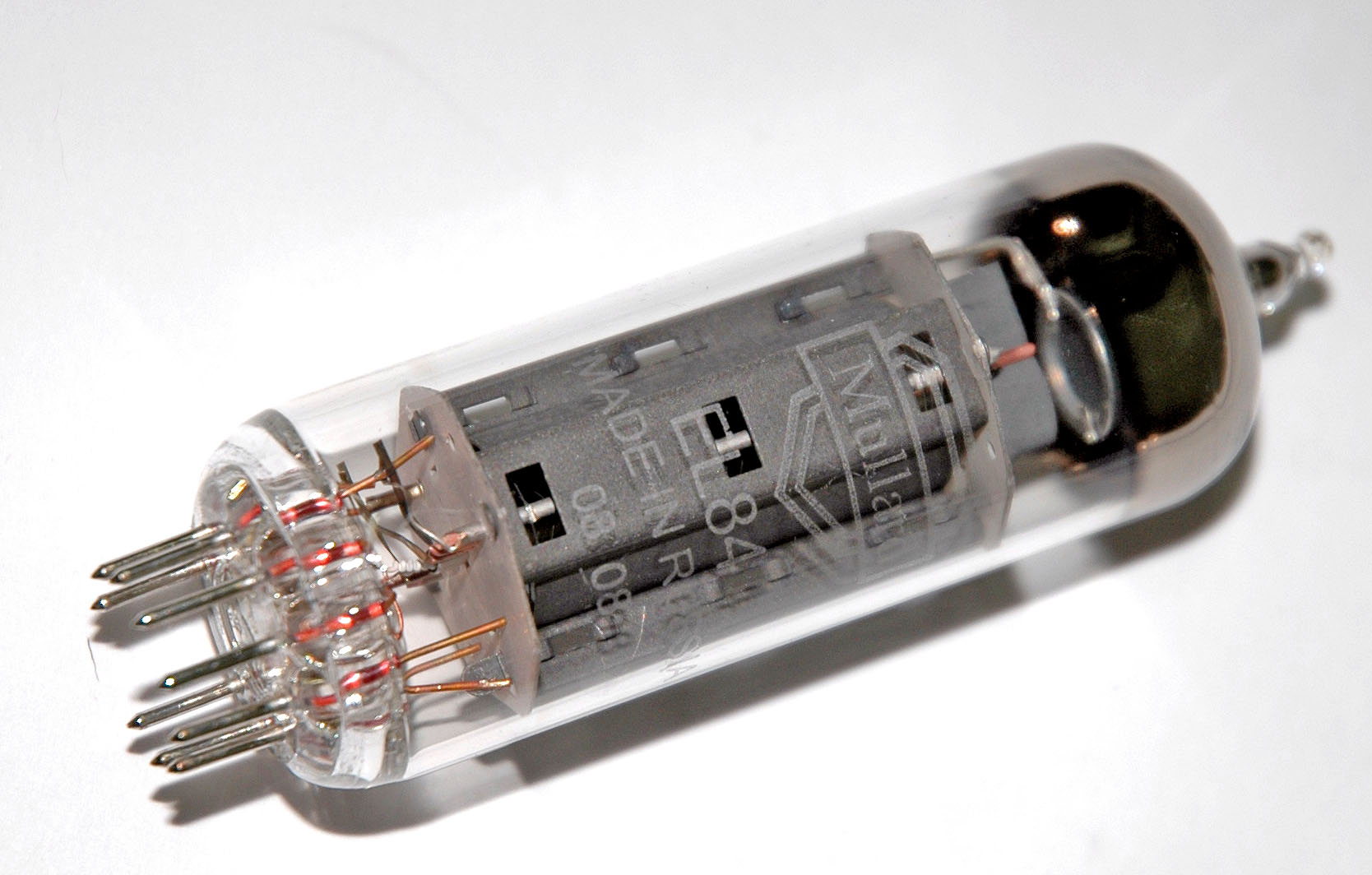
An EL84 valve made in Russia in the 21st century

Mullard Limited was a British manufacturer of electronic components. The Mullard Radio Valve Co. Ltd. of Southfields, London, was founded in 1920 by Captain Stanley R. Mullard, who had previously designed thermionic valves for the Admiralty before becoming managing director of the Z Electric Lamp Co. The company soon moved to Hammersmith, London and then in 1923 to Balham, London. The head office in later years was Mullard House at 1–19 Torrington Place, Bloomsbury, now part of University College London.

Stanley Mullard financed the rapid expansion of his factories to meet the demand of the new British Broadcasting Corporation by selling half of the company shares to Philips. In 1927 Mullard sold the remaining shares to Philips, becoming a wholly-owned subsidiary.

The Mullard factory in Blackburn was once the largest manufacturer of valves in Europe, with production peaking in the 1960s. As valves were replaced by transistors, the site began making cathode ray tubes for televisions, then optical disks in the 1980s, before finally closing.

As Blackburn declined a large new semiconductor factory was opened in Southampton, and itself was the largest factory of its kind in Europe.

Philips stopped using the Mullard brand in 1988. The Crawley defence electronics unit in Crawley was bought by Thorn EMI, which itself was bought by Thales. The two semiconductor manufacturing sites were sold to what is now Nexperia, with the Hazel Grove site still producing components.

== Start-up ==
In 1921, the directors were Sir Ralph Ashton (chairman), Basil Binyon of the Radio Communication Co, C.F. Elwell and S.R. Mullard (managing director).

== Partnership with Philips ==
In 1923, to meet the technical demands of the newly formed BBC, Mullard formed a partnership with the Dutch manufacturer Philips. The valves (vacuum tubes) produced in this period were named with the prefix PM, for Philips-Mullard, beginning with the PM3 and PM4 in 1926. Mullard finally sold all its shares to Philips in 1927. In 1928, the company introduced the first pentode valve to the British market.

== Factories ==
=== Mitcham ===
Mullard opened a new manufacturing plant at the end of New Road, Mitcham, Surrey in 1929. A second building was added in 1936. Both buildings had a very distinctive flat roof construction and were very similar to those at Philips' headquarters in Eindhoven, Netherlands. Co-sited with the Mullard buildings was the manufacturing complex for Philips Radios. Mitcham was also home to the Mullard Application Laboratory.

=== Blackburn ===
In the late 1930s Philips opened a plant in Blackburn, Lancashire, and during the Second World War some operations were moved there from Mitcham; by the end of the war, nearly 3,000 were employed. Tungsten and molybdenum wire were produced on-site from 1954, and a glass factory was built in 1955. In 1962 over 6,200 were employed and Mullard described the Blackburn works as "the largest valve manufacturing plant in Europe".

By 1949 Mullard had produced a number of television sets, such as the MTS-521 and MTS-684. In 1951 Mullard was producing the LSD series of photographic flash tubes.

=== Others ===
Mullard had factories in Southport and Simonstone, both in Lancashire. The latter closed in 2004. There was also a sister factory at Belmont in Durham (closed in June 2005). Other factories included those at Fleetwood (closed in 1979) and Lytham St. Annes (closed in 1972). A feeder factory at Haydock closed in 1981. A small factory in Hove closed in the early 1970s.

== Teletext ==
In the early 1980s, Mullard manufactured the SAA5050, one of the first teletext character generator modules made in the UK.

== Semiconductors ==
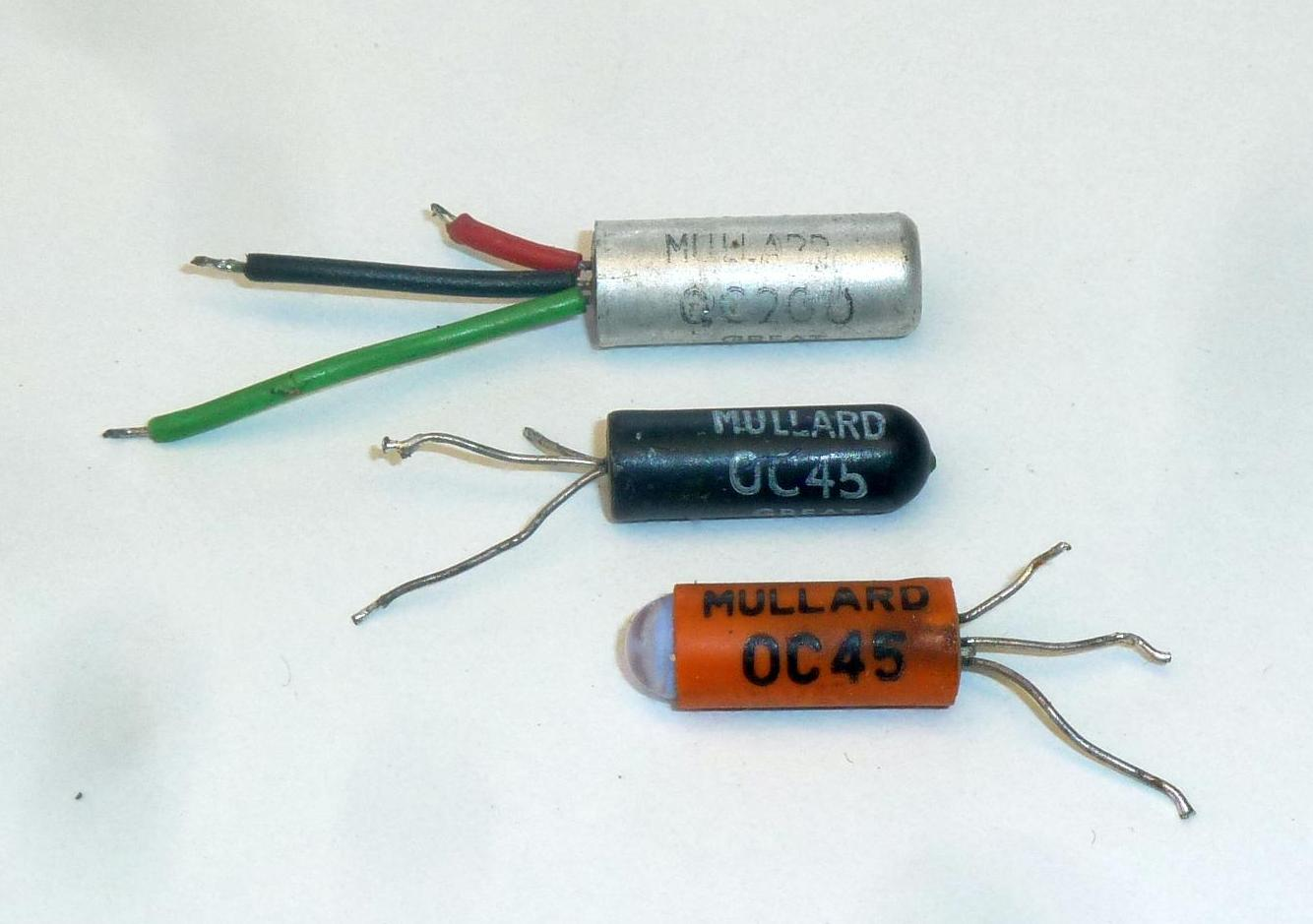
Mullard transistors of the 1960s, showing the variety of SO-2 packages used: OC200, silicon PNP transistor in an aluminium can.; Germanium OC45 in a black-painted glass package.; OC45 in a clear glass and blue putty package, with rubber sleeve

Mullard owned semiconductor factories in Southampton and Hazel Grove, Stockport, Cheshire.

Southampton (Millbrook Trading Estate) was a purpose-built plant, opened in 1957 for the manufacture of semiconductors. Production of germanium alloy transistors was transferred from Mitcham. At the same time the plant started the research, development and production of electro optical devices. Fabrication of planar devices on a mass production basis did not begin until 1966, when germanium sales were decreasing. 1967 saw the start of the development and production of integrated circuits. The plant was planned to be the biggest semiconductor facility in Europe, employing 3,000 people including 200 scientists and engineers.

In 1962 Associated Semiconductor Manufacturers (ASM) Ltd was formed by Mullard and GEC to combine the semiconductor development and production facilities of the two companies; Mullard owned two-thirds of the company and included the Southampton plant; GEC contributed their small factory in School Street, Hazel Grove, producing thyristors, rectifiers and power diodes. GEC pulled out of ASM Ltd in 1969. In 1972 production was moved to a newly constructed factory nearby on Bramhall Moor Lane.

Both sites were later owned by NXP Semiconductors (formerly Philips Semiconductors). The Southampton site is now closed. Hazel Grove, Stockport specialises in power semiconductor devices and is now Nexperia Manchester.

The first transistors produced by Mullard were the OC50 and OC51 point-contact types in 1952, which were not widely used. In 1953 Mullard moved to junction transistors, beginning with the plastic-cased OC10 series. These were followed by the glass-encapsulated OC43...47, OC70/71, (released in 1957) and OC80 series (the output devices were metal encapsulated to facilitate heatsinking), which were produced in large numbers and copied by other companies, such as Valvo (another Philips subsidiary) and Siemens in Germany, and Amperex (another Philips subsidiary) in the USA. RF transistors were the OC170 and OC171. All these were germanium PNP transistors. Mullard's first silicon transistors were the OC201 to OC207, PNP alloy types using the standard SO-2 metal-over-glass construction such as the OC200 shown. From about 1960 Mullard switched to using the BC prefix for silicon, and AC for germanium, eliminating the confusion of part numbers. in the mid-1960s the first plastic packages were introduced. In 1964 the company produced a prototype electronic desktop calculator as a technology demonstrator for its transistors and cold cathode indicator tubes.

== Space science and astronomy ==
In 1957 Philips-Mullard helped to set up the Mullard Radio Astronomy Observatory (MRAO) at the University of Cambridge. In 1966 the Mullard Space Science Laboratory (MSSL) was opened near Dorking, Surrey as part of University College London. The Royal Society Mullard Award for "those who have an outstanding academic record in any area of natural science, engineering or technology and to individuals or teams whose work has the potential to make a contribution to national prosperity", previously for young researchers but as of 2025 with no restrictions on career stage, has been awarded annually from 1967.

== Mullard brand name ==
Philips continued to use the brand name "Mullard" in the UK until 1988. Mullard Research Laboratories in Redhill, Surrey then became Philips Research Laboratories. As of 2007, the Mullard brand was used by Sovtek for valves sold as ECC83, EL34 (European type numbers used by Mullard and many others), etc.

== Z Electric Lamp Company ==
The Z Electric Lamp Co. continued business into the 1970s operating from premises in Thornton Heath, southern Greater London, manufacturing lamps of specialised design. However, it closed due to the recession in the mid-1970s.

== 50th Anniversary in 1970 ==
To mark the 50th anniversary of the founding of the company, Mullard management decided to have a rose named after the company. Mullard's quest was simple, they wanted a world-beater, nothing less, so they contacted the renowned grower Sam McGredy IV in Northern Ireland. The naming fee of £10,000/$24,000 was a lot of money in 1970 and established a record fee for a new rose: Mullard Jubilee "Electron". To mark the occasion every employee received a "Mullard Jubilee" rose bush.

== See also ==
- Mullard–Philips tube designation
- MEL Equipment
