= 6N1P =

Medium gain double triode vacuum tube

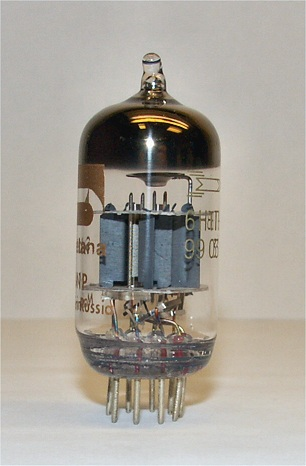
Current production 6N1P-EV tube (1999) branded with the original factory logo (right) and Svetlana brand name (left)

The 6N1P (Russian: 6Н1П) is a Russian-made miniature 9-pin medium gain double triode vacuum tube intended for use as a line audio amplifier and cathode driver.

Basic data:

- Uf = 6.3 V, If = 600 mA
- μ = 35
- Ia = 7.5 mA
- S = 4.35 mA/V
- Pa = 2.2 W

The 6N1P has similar ratings to the 6DJ8 and in the past was sometimes rebranded as such, however differences between the two types (the 6N1P requires almost twice the filament current and has only one third the S value) mean they are not directly interchangeable. The S is about 4.35 mA/V, the 6DJ8/ECC88 has a S of 12.5 ma/V and a gain of 33 and a lower internal resistance. However, the 6N1P is typically more linear for a given load. It is therefore inaccurate to say that these two tubes are identical. The correct Russian equivalent to the 6DJ8/ECC88 is the 6N23P, the latter has a S of 12.5 mA/V and a gain of 33.

The closest western equivalent to the 6N1P is the well known 6BQ7A. A ruggedized/extended ratings version of the tube is designated 6N1P-EV (Russian: 6Н1П-ЕВ). It has currently found a use as a driver tube in hi-fi tube amplifiers (such as Audio Research models VS55 and VS110) because of its excellent low distortion and low noise characteristics. The tube is manufactured by the "Voskhod" plant in Kaluga, Russia (see ) and is distributed in the West under the Sovtek and Svetlana brand names.

== See also ==
- 6DJ8
- 6N2P
- 6N3P
