= Pultec EQP-1 =

Audio equalizer

Pultec EQP-1 Program Equalizer
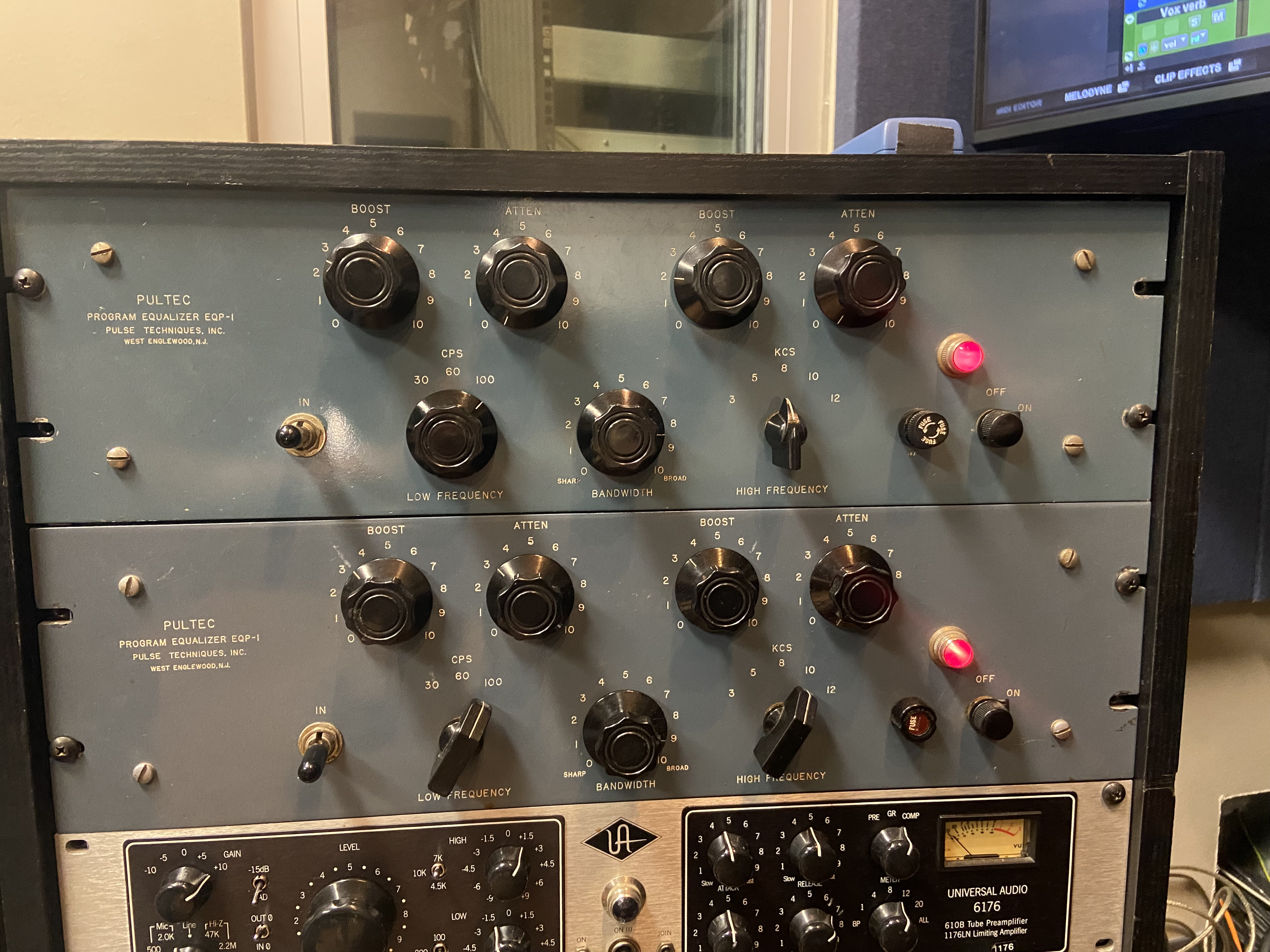
- Manufacturer: Pulse Techniques
- Dates: 1956–1981, 2000–present

Technical specifications
- Effects type: Equalization
- Hardware: Tube amplifier
- Filter: One shelving filter, one peaking filter, one low-pass filter

Controls

Input/output
- Inputs: 1
- Outputs: 1

The Pultec EQP-1 Program Equalizer is an audio equalizer unit originally produced by Pulse Techniques (Pultec) from 1956 to 1981, and again since 2000 by a successor company.

The EQP-1 and its variants were widely used in professional recording studios and established as a studio standard. It was inducted into the TECnology Hall of Fame in 2005. Numerous hardware variants and software plug-in emulations of the unit have been produced.

== History ==
Electronics engineers and former RCA Institute classmates Eugene Shenk and Ollie Summerlin founded Pulse Techniques, Incorporated (Pultec) on February 1, 1953. Based in Teaneck, New Jersey, Pultec initially manufactured specialized equipment for professional audio engineers, such as adjustable power supplies for vacuum tube equipment and test oscillators.

Clair D. Krepps, who had previously worked with Summerlin both in the United States Navy and at Capitol Records building the label's New York mastering studio, had since become the chief engineer at MGM Studios in New York and was renting bench space in Pultec's shop. Krepps encouraged Summerlin and Shenk to design and manufacture a specialized equalizer designed for recording studio applications that would be unlike the noisy equalizers designed for the film industry that were available at the time. Krepps provided $250 as seed money and an MGM purchase order to Pultec to design and build such a unit. The resulting Pultec EQP-1 Program Equalizer was introduced in 1956.

In 1981, after 25 years of Pultec manufacturing the EQP-1, Shenk wanted to retire; as he was unsuccessful in finding a buyer for Pultec, he shut production down. He was later contacted by producer and Power Station recording studio owner Tony Bongiovi, who wanted 24 EQP-1A3 units, which were produced in a final run by Shenk.

In 2000, Steve Jackson sought to build a completely accurate recreation of the original EQP-1, and contacted Shenk for guidance. After 10 years of development, Jackson established Pulse Techniques, LLC and resumed the manufacturing of the EQP-1A3 and other classic Pultec models.

== Design ==
The EQP-1 is a passive equalizer with a tube amplifier stage that restores the gain lost from the EQ, making it practical for use in broadcast and recording.

Its low frequency section is a shelving filter with three selectable frequency bands at 30, 60, and 100 Hz, which can be simultaneously boosted or attenuated. Its parametric high frequency section offers boosting at 3, 5, 8, 10, and 12 kHz, with a separate bandwidth control for altering the Q of the filter. In addition, it has a separate variable-attenuation 10 kHz low-pass filter.

The amplifier stage is balanced and operates in a push‑pull arrangement. Its input section is built around a 12AX7/ECC83 vacuum tube, while the output transformer is driven by a 12AU7/ECC82 tube. Transformer distortion and some output loading effects are automatically compensated for via negative feedback achieved by secondary winding on the output transformer.

=== Models ===
EQP-1 (1956) - Pultec's original program equalizer, housed in a 3U 19-inch rack chassis.

EQH-2 (1956) - 2U two-band (low shelf and high peak) equalizer with a different amplifier design and EQ curves, which were later incorporated into the EQP-1A.

EQP-1A (1961) - The EQP-1 was replaced by the updated EQP-1A, which added a 20 Hz setting for the low-frequency shelving filter, a 16 kHz setting for the high-frequency filter, and 5 kHz and 20 kHz settings for the low-pass filter.

EQP-1S - A variant of the EQP-1 with modified low-frequency response curves, two additional high-frequency boost frequencies, and two additional high-frequency boost response curves.

EQP-1A3 (1971) - A 2U version of the EQP-1A with identical features and circuitry.

EQP-1A3SS - A solid-state version of the EQP-1A, with the tube amplifier section replaced by a discrete transistor-based amplifier.

== In use ==
The design of the EQP-1 allows a user to simultaneously boost and attenuate slightly different ranges of low frequencies using the low shelving filter. While the original owner's manual advised against this, the technique (often referred to as the "Pultec low-end trick" or the "Pultec trick") became commonplace.

The EQP-1 and its variants were widely adopted by professional recording studios, including Universal Recording Corporation, Capitol, RCA Victor, Abbey Road, Decca, and Olympic.

== Legacy ==
Once out of production, original Pultecs became harder to find, with mint examples selling for $6,000 or more. Recognizing the market's need for an EQ with the Pultec's features, manufacturers introduced recreations and new versions. In 1985, the Danish company Lydkraft launched the Tube-Tech brand with the PE 1A equalizer, a near-direct copy of the EQP-1A. In 1990, Manley Laboratories contacted Eugene Shenk to ask his permission to produce its own version of the EQP-1A, resulting in the updated Manley Enhanced 'Pultec' Equalizer. In 2010, Cartec introduced the EQP1A, utilizing transformers and inductors of the company's own design. Pultec-inspired EQs have also been released by Warm Audio, Klark Teknik, WesAudio, Retro Instruments, and others.

The unit has also been emulated by various software plug-ins, including the Apogee FX Rack, Avid Pultec Bundle, iZotope Ozone 8 Vintage EQ, Universal Audio Pultec Passive EQ Collection, and Waves PuigTec EQ (named after engineer and producer Jack Joseph Puig).
