= 4-1000A =

Tetrode used in radio transmitters

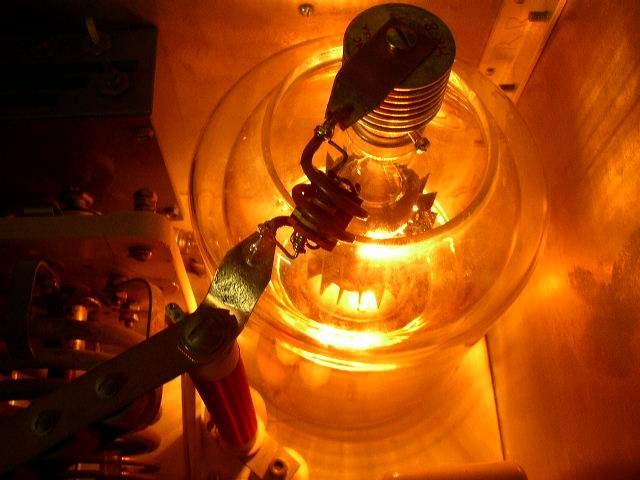
4-1000A Power Tube

The 4-1000A/8166 is a radial-beam tetrode designed for use in radio transmitters. The 4-1000A is the largest of a series of tubes including the 4-65A, 4-125A, 4-250A, and the 4-400A. These tubes share a common naming convention in which the first number identifies the number of elements contained within the tube; i.e., the number "4" identifies the tube as a tetrode which contains four elements (filament, control grid, screen grid, and anode), and the second number indicates the maximum continuous power dissipation of the anode in Watts. The entire family of tubes can be used as oscillators, modulators, and amplifiers.

== Specifications ==
The 4-1000A is a relatively large glass tube with an overall height of 9.25 inches and a diameter of 5 inches. It is designed to operate with its plate (anode) at an orange-red color due to the "getter" being a zirconium compound on the anode structure which requires a great deal of heat to be effective. The cathode is a directly heated, thoriated-tungsten filament rated at 7.5 volts at 21 amperes. Connections to the filament and grids are made via a special 5-pin socket, and the anode connection is at the top of the tube.

The tube may be operated as a class C amplifier in which a single tube can provide up to 3340 watts of RF power. A pair of tubes may be operated as an audio-frequency modulator for an AM transmitter; in this case a pair of tubes will provide up to 3,840 watts of audio power.

== Internal construction ==
The 4-1000A is of radial construction; the most obvious feature is the large, roughly cylindrical, blackish anode suspended from the top of the tube. The anode, which may be constructed out of metal or graphite, is finned for increased heat dissipation. The filament and grids are supported from the lower section/base of the tube.

== Sources ==
The 4-1000A was available from multiple manufacturers including RCA, EIMAC, AMPEREX, and Triton.

== Cooling ==
A complete cooling system is required to operate the tube at rated values. A centrifugal fan pressurizes the equipment chassis and provides a continuous stream of cooling air. A specially designed socket is used to direct the air over the filament and grid connections, and a glass chimney (Pyrex) then directs the air around the tube's glass envelope; chassis-mounted metal clips are used to center the chimney around the tube. Finally, a finned, cylindrical heat sink is attached to the anode connection (top of the tube) to provide additional cooling for the anode's glass-to-metal seal.

== Variants ==
The 4-1000A was modified for operation in pulsed applications; the modified tube, identified as the 4PR1000A/8189, can be operated with anode voltages as high as 30 kV DC and peak plate current of 8.0 Amperes, but at a reduced duty cycle.
