= 6DJ8 =

Model of double triode vacuum tube

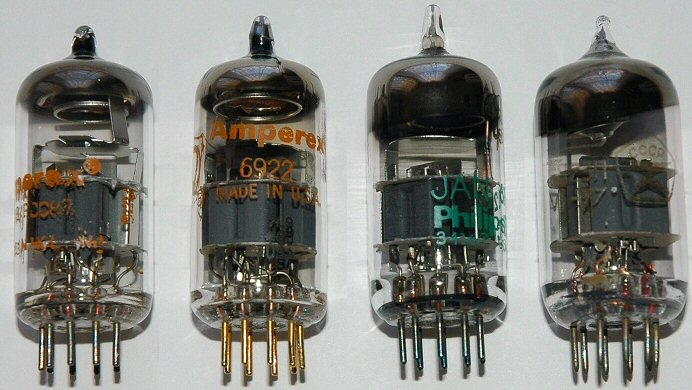
ECC88, 6922, 6DJ8 and 6N23P

The 6DJ8 is a miniature nine-pin medium-gain dual-triode vacuum tube. It is distinguished by its very high transconductance, mostly the result of its frame grid construction. Versions of the tube are named ECC88, E88CC, 6922, E188CC, CV4108, 7308, 6N11 and 6N23P.

== Origins ==
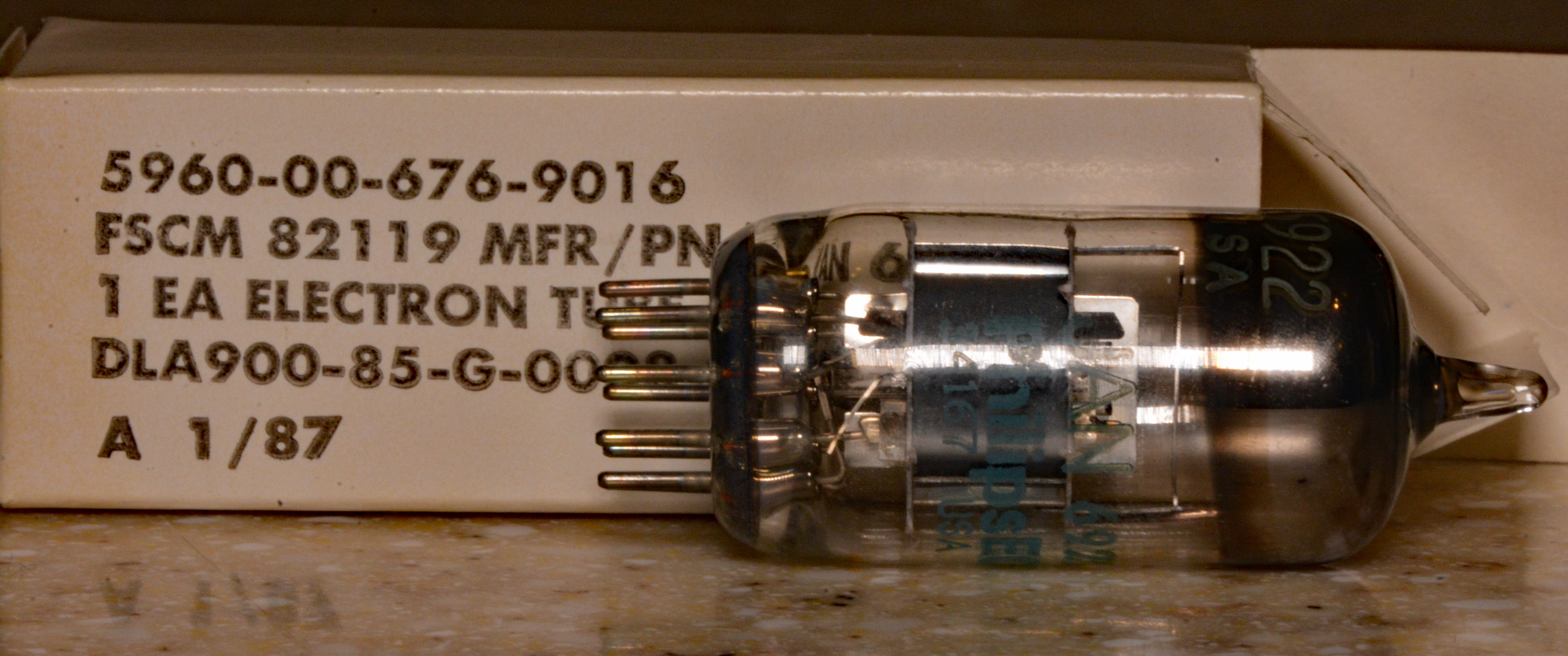
A Philips JAN 6922 made in the USA

The tube was developed by Philips in the Netherlands under European designation ECC88. The series-string version 7DJ8 / PCC88 was also introduced at the same time. The 6DJ8 was designed for use as a low-noise amplifier in VHF and UHF TV tuners, an improved successor to the usual 6BK7, but due to its high gain it was heavily used in high-end test equipment, for example, most high-quality oscilloscopes from the 1950s to the 1960s utilize a number of 6DJ8 tubes.

== Audio ==
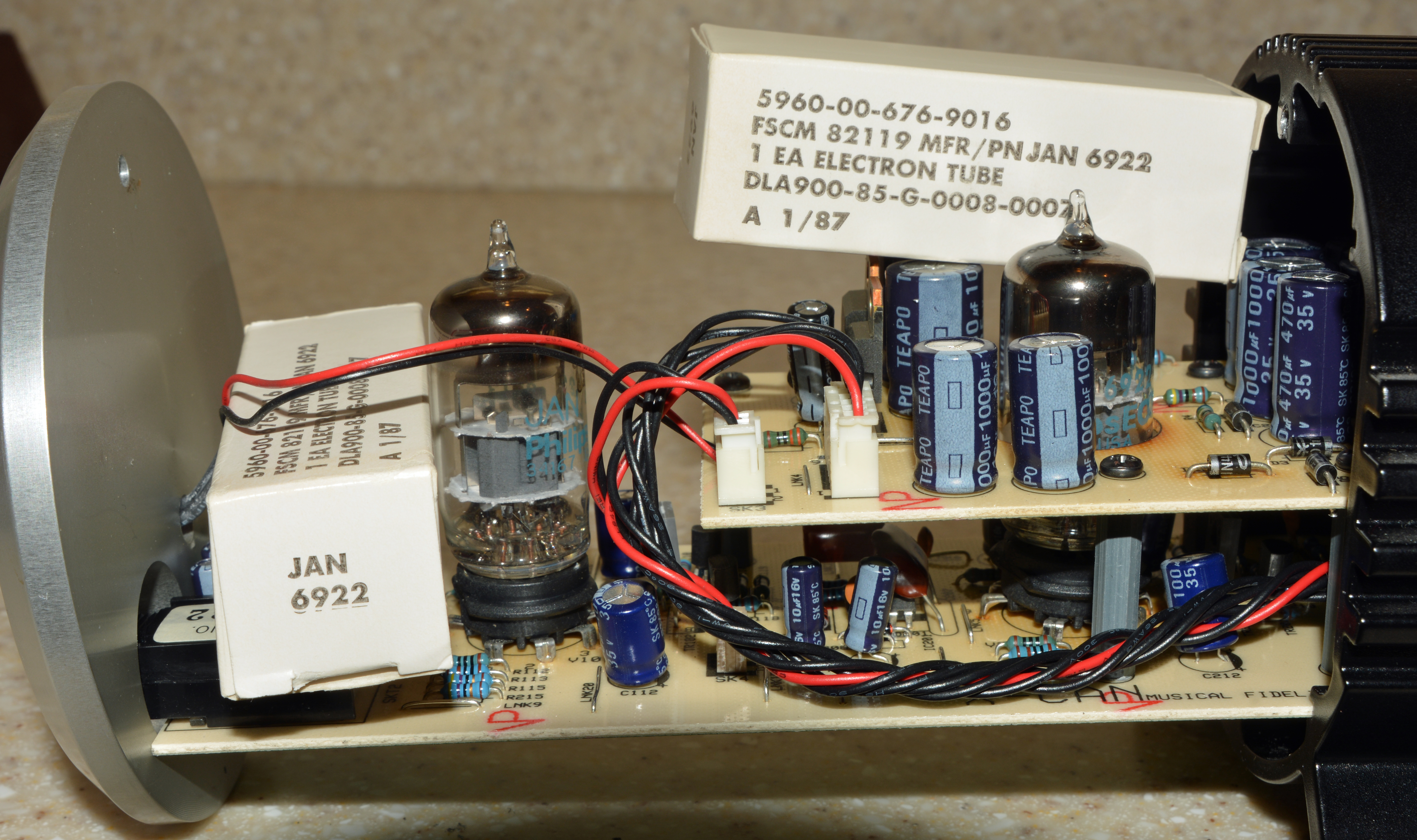
Two 6922s used in a headphone amp

Although not originally designed for the purpose, it became popular in hi-fi audio amplifiers. European-produced version of the tube is designated ECC88. An industrial (improved/higher ratings) version of the tube was designated 6922 / E88CC between 1959 and 1961. Siemens introduced their own super ECC88 / 6DJ8 at the same time under CCa type. New Old Stock (NOS) 6DJ8s and ECC88s produced in the past by major American or West European vacuum tube manufacturers (such as Philips or Amperex) remain extremely popular with and highly sought by audiophiles. A version (direct equivalent) of this tube was also produced in the Soviet Union as 6N23P (Russian: 6Н23П).

As of 2015 the tube was being produced in three versions in Eastern Europe - Slovakia by JJ Electronic (ex-Tesla), and in Russia: 6DJ8 for Sovtek and 6922 for Electro-Harmonix.

== See also ==
- 6N23P (Direct equivalent)
- 6N1P (Not a direct equivalent)
- 6N3P (Not a direct equivalent)
- List of vacuum tubes
