= 6N2P =

Miniature 9-pin dual triode vacuum tube

The 6N2P, (Russian: 6Н2П), also sometimes spelled in English "6H2Pi", is a miniature 9-pin dual triode vacuum tube manufactured in USSR, Russia and China with characteristics similar to the 12AX7. The most significant difference between the two is that 6N2P has its two filament elements connected in parallel, unlike the series filament connection of the 12AX7, and it is thus only possible to operate it from a 6.3 volt, 340 mA filament supply (whereas a 12AX7 may be operated from either 6.3 or 12.6 volts, at 300 mA or 150 mA, respectively.)

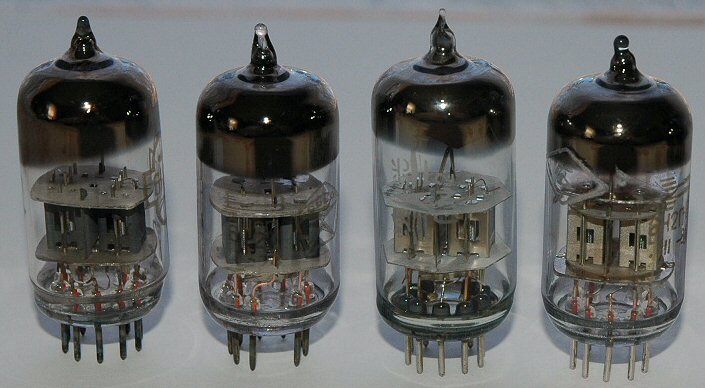
Different 6N2P versions

The 6N2P is not a pin-compatible replacement for the 12AX7 - an adapter (Or rewiring the valve socket) is required. The amplification factor of 6N2P is 98 which is marginally lesser than 12AX7, its higher heater current draw is similar to a 5751. The Chinese 6N4 (whose military issued variant is known by the designation 6N4-J) which is a pin-compatible replacement for the 12AX7 but has an amplification factor of 97.5 is the closest equivalent to the 6N2P.

In the 1970s an improved and more rugged version of the 6N2 was introduced, designated 6N2P-EV (Russian: 6Н2П-ЕВ). They also introduced a long life variant of the 6N2P-EV, designated 6N2P-ER (Russian: 6Н2П-ЕP). While the 6N2P-EV had a rated lifespan of ≥ 5,000 hours, the 6N2P-ER had a rated lifespan of ≥ 10,000 hours.

In the late 1980s Voskhod Sunrise produced a 12AX7 variant derived from the 6N2P-EV, under the designation 12AX7VKA. The Voskhod Sunrise 12AX7VKA tube used a larger bottle than other 12AX7s and did not fit in most Chinese shield bases. However, it did fit in most NOS and Korean made shield bases. Currently, a re-issue of the Voskhod Sunrise 12AX7VKA albeit with a smaller normal 12AX7 sized glass bottle is being produced by Sovtek, under the designation 12AX7WA.

A Chinese version of 6N2P exists, labeled in Latin lettering (instead of Cyrillic) 6N2. A Chinese version of the triple mica 6N2P-EV exists too, designated 6N2T. Currently a 12AX7 variant derived from the Chinese 6N2T is manufactured by the Shuguang tube factory exclusively for Tube Amp Doctor, under the designation ECC83 WA (7025 WA designation is used for the ones specially selected for high gain and low noise).

In the 1990s a (now extinct) line of "Red Bear" guitar amplifiers was being produced in Russia by Novik Ltd. and distributed in the United States by Gibson Guitar Corporation. These amplifiers used 6N2P-EV tubes instead of the much more common 12AX7, prompting user modifications of the amplifier to 12AX7, because the original Russian 6N2P-EV was scarcely available outside of Russia.
