= Amperex Electronic =

Amperex Electronic Corporation
- Company type: Electronics manufacturer
- Industry: Electronics manufacturing
- Founded: 1920s
- Headquarters: Brooklyn, New York; Hicksville, New York; Slatersville, Rhode Island; Cranston, Rhode Island, United States
- Key people: James A Robinson-President (1980 - Merger), Sam Norris, Frank Randall-General Sales Manager, Irwin Rudich-Product Manager(special purpose tubes and semiconductors), Charles Roddy-Product Manager (transmitting tubes), Michael J. Pawelko-Engineering Manager (1949-1986) Employee 300 per location, with various locations worldwide John Messerschmidt;
- Products: vacuum tubes, semiconductors

Amperex Electronic Corporation was a manufacturer of vacuum tubes and semiconductors.

== Brooklyn, New York ==
Originally located at 79 Washington Street in Brooklyn, New York, Amperex was a long-established manufacturer of transmitting tubes when they were acquired by the Dutch firm, Philips, (known more widely as Norelco in the US), around 1955. Philips continued to improve and enlarge the tube plant in New York, but also used the Amperex name to distribute their new line of Dutch-made miniature tubes, (12AX7, 12AU7, 12AT7) to feed the booming U.S. hi-fi market. Classic hi-fi brands such as Marantz, Fisher, and H. H. Scott, Inc., used these tubes. Amperex also produced the 6DJ8, 6922 and 7308 frame grid tubes. Developed by Amperex in 1958 when transistors were beginning to supplant tubes and originally developed for video and radar use, the 6DJ8 also excelled in audio amplifiers needing its high transconductance, and it still has a niche market among audiophiles.

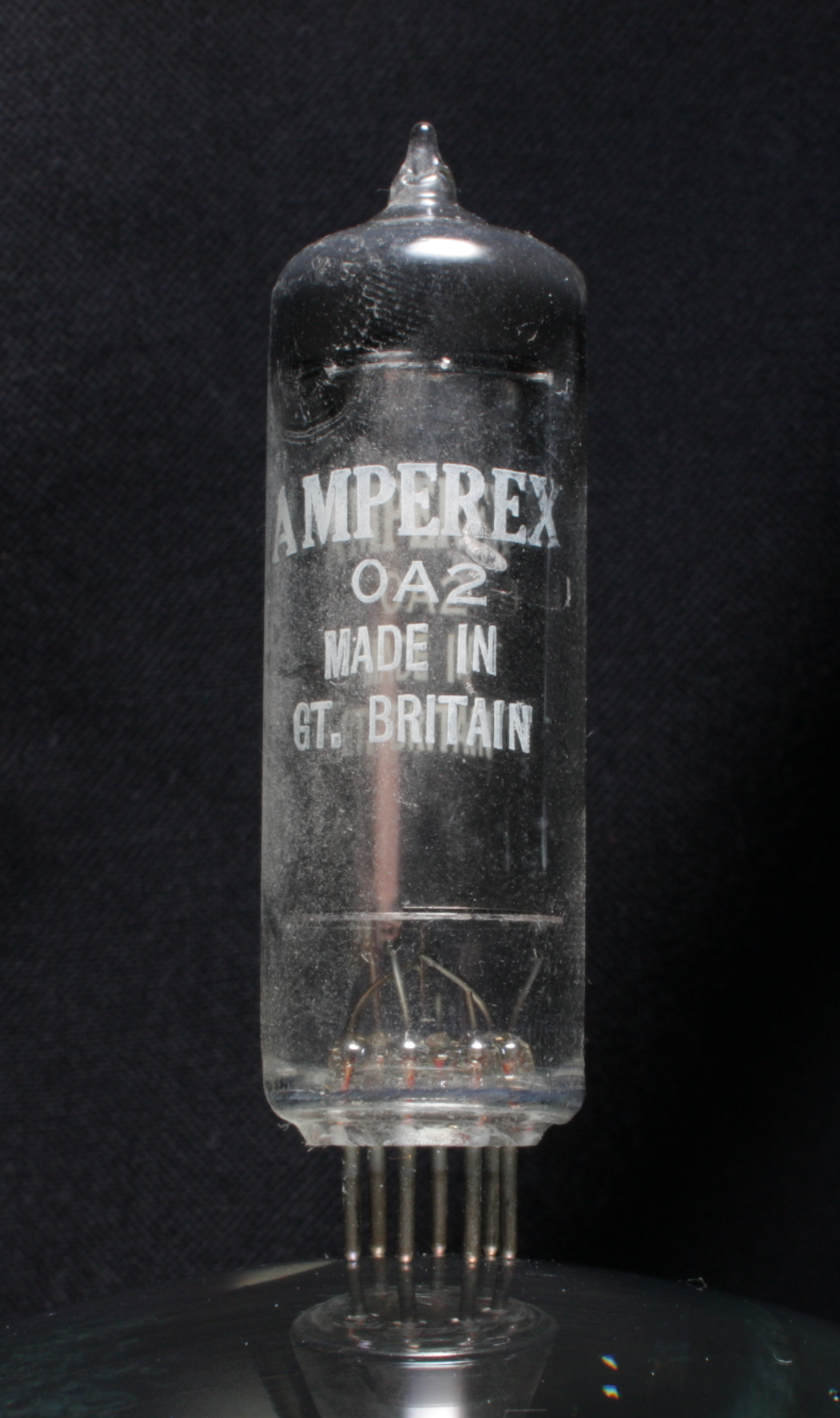
A voltage regulator vacuum tube made by Amperex

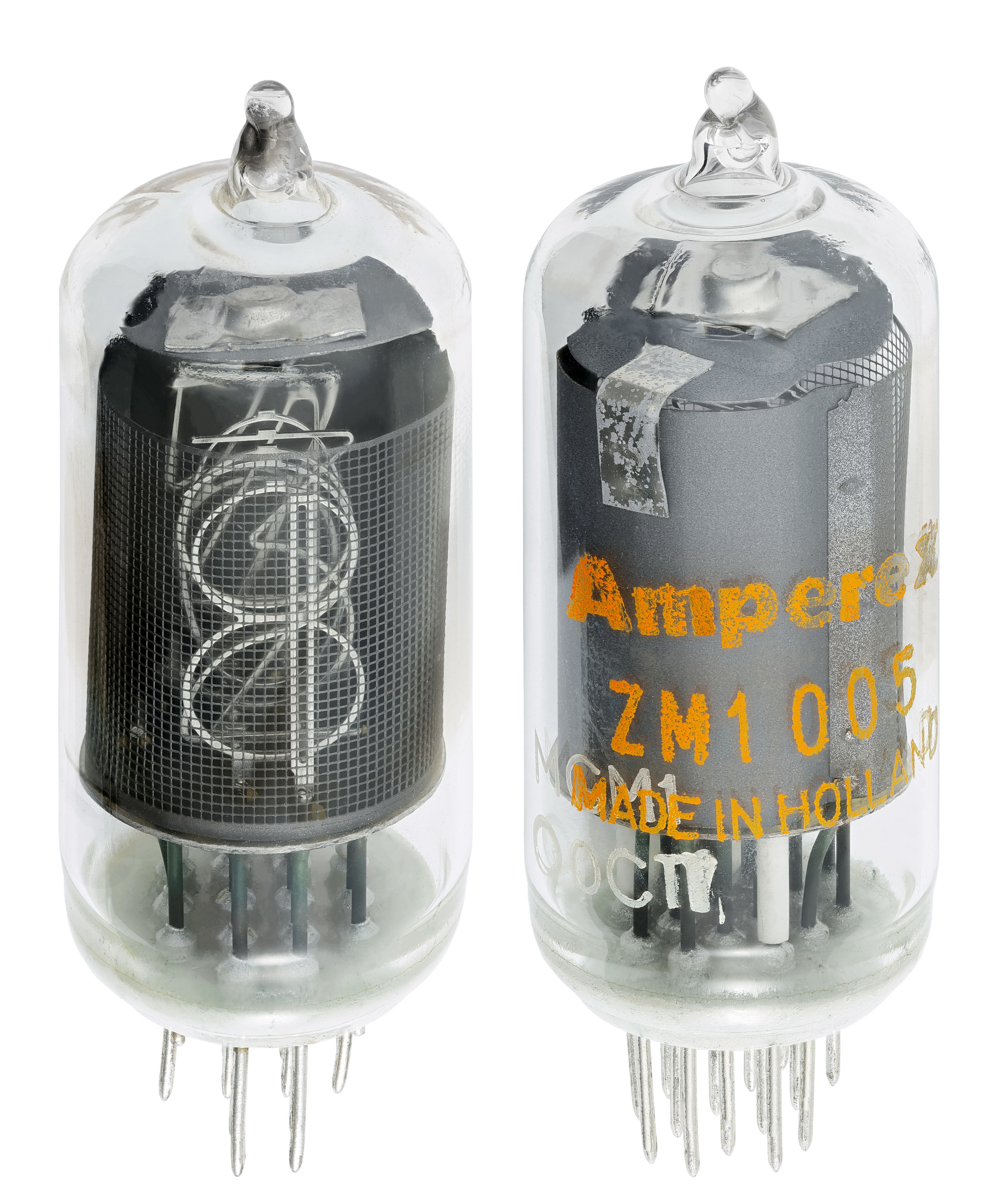
A Nixie tube made by Amperex

Amperex tubes were original equipment parts in many models of Tektronix and Hewlett-Packard test equipment. Although Amperex stopped making vacuum tubes long ago, hoards of new old stock (especially the original "Bugle Boy" series) are traded for profit, and other manufacturers produced compatible tubes more recently.

== Hicksville, New York ==
Amperex facility in Hicksville, New York

A new factory was constructed at 230 Duffy Avenue, Hicksville, New York, to manufacture electron tubes and semiconductors. Miniature receiving tubes, magnetrons, X-ray tubes, Geiger-Muller tubes, and large transmitting tubes were also manufactured at this location. This location became the headquarters for North American Philips (NAP). The factory was completed in 1953 and closed in 1989. All assets were then sold to Richardson Electronics of rural Lafox, near Batavia, Illinois.

The Hicksville factory had a company-sponsored softball team that played at Eisenhower Park (then called Salisbury Park) in East Meadow, New York.

== Slatersville, Rhode Island ==
Amperex facility in Slatersville, Rhode Island

Amperex facility in Slatersville, Rhode Island

North American Philips Corporation built a 40,000 sq ft (3,700 m^{2}) plant at 100 Providence Pike, North Smithfield, Rhode Island (Slatersville) on a 15-acre (61,000 m^{2}) plot in 1959. The 15-acre property is recorded by the Town of North Smithfield Tax Assessor as Lot No. 60 on Plat No. 4, and Lot No. 385 on Plat No. 5. There are five buildings located on the property. The property is bordered to the north by Industrial Drive; to the south by Comstock Road, to the east by a grassy area; and to the west by Providence Pike. The plant was operated by one of Philips' fully owned subsidiaries, Amperex Electronics, to supply IBM, one of Philips' largest customers, with high speed, gold-doped germanium logic diodes. Millions of these diodes were manufactured at the Slatersville plant every year. With the advent of silicon diodes in 1962 there was a decreasing demand for these germanium diodes, so Philips transferred their germanium Post Alloy Diffused Transistor (PADT) manufacturing to Slatersville to take advantage of the site's capacity.

In 1960 Philips invented an imaging tube called the Plumbicon to replace the vidicon and Image Orthicon tubes used in studio television cameras. The technical advantages of this new tube allowed true color fidelity to be seen in television broadcasts for the first time. In 1967 the Academy of Television Arts and Sciences presented Philips with an Emmy Award for "Outstanding Achievement in Engineering Development" for the invention of the Plumbicon tube.

The popularity of the Plumbicon tubes was so great that Amperex, built a second plant adjacent to the 1959 building on the Slatersville site to meet the demand. The new plant was 85,000 sq ft (7,900 m^{2}), and at the time of construction employed the largest and cleanest clean room facilities in the world. The plant was officially opened in 1967 and is still making Plumbicon camera tubes today. Although the original use of Plumbicon camera tubes was in broadcast television, current demand is primarily in for use in medical imaging equipment.

In 1973, several years after its acquisition by Amperex, the manufacturing operations of Advanced Micro Electronics were transferred to Slatersville. The products transferred from Advanced Micro Electronics included small signal silicon planar transistors for military and industrial applications, Leadless Inverted Devices (LIDs) and hybrid circuits using both thin and thick film technology. Manufacturing of these three products and the sales office for Philips Semiconductors were housed in Slatersville until 1992 when this business unit was sold.

In 1998 Philips Components purchased, from English Electric Valve (EEV), the only other lead oxide camera tube business still in existence and so became the World's sole lead oxide camera tube manufacturer.

== Cranston, Rhode Island ==
Amperex facility in Cranston, Rhode Island

Amperex had a 25,000-square-foot (2,300 m^{2}) manufacturing facility at 99 Bald Hill Road, Cranston, Rhode Island, that manufactured monolithic integrated circuits . It was acquired by Micro Components Corporation, later renamed Cherry Semiconductor, moved to 2000 South County Trl, East Greenwich, RI. then sold to ON Semiconductor, a subsidiary of Motorola until 1999.

== Other divisions ==
Ferroxcube, in Saugerties, New York, manufactured components for data processing equipment, namely, electromagnetic cores, memory planes, stacks of memory planes with controlled networks, shielding beads, threaded slugs, choke coils, filters, resistors, magnetic recording head assemblies, memory systems, Peltier batteries with or without control networks, capacitors, and magnetostrictive ferrites. Ferroxcube now belongs to Yageo Corporation.

Amperex also operated a site in North Smithfield, RI . In the 1980s it was used for marketing, sales, QC and Engineering R&D of their discrete semi-conductor business. Before any components were shipped to US based customers QC staff would run some or all pieces through EATON testing equipment. Engineers at customer sites would work with Amperex engineers to determine the best use and components for the customer needs.

== Other products ==
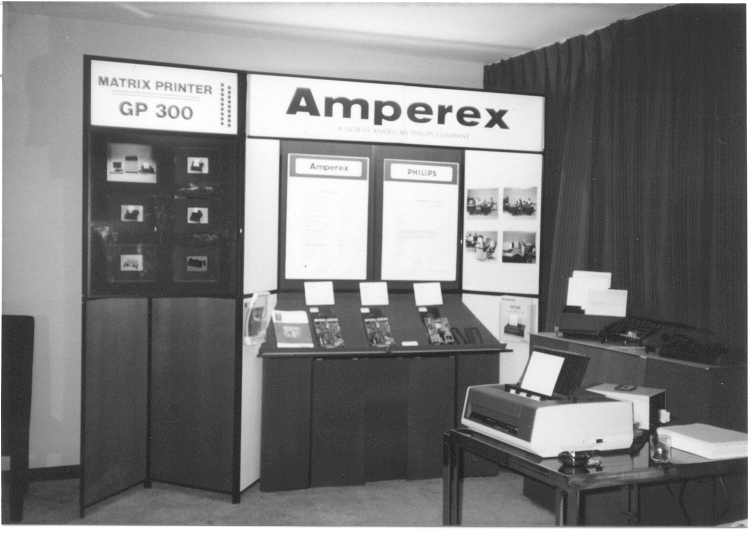
GP-300_Matrix Printer

For a brief time Amperex distributed a dot matrix printer, model GP-300.

== Patents ==
- "GRAPHICAL DATA DEVICE", United States Patent 3,838,212, September 24, 1974, assigned to Amperex Electronics Corporation, Hicksville, New York.
- "Apparatus for Recognizing Hand Printed Characters", United States Patent 3,909,785, September 30, 1975, assigned to Amperex Electronics Corporation, Hicksville, New York.
