= 6N3P =

Double triode vacuum tube

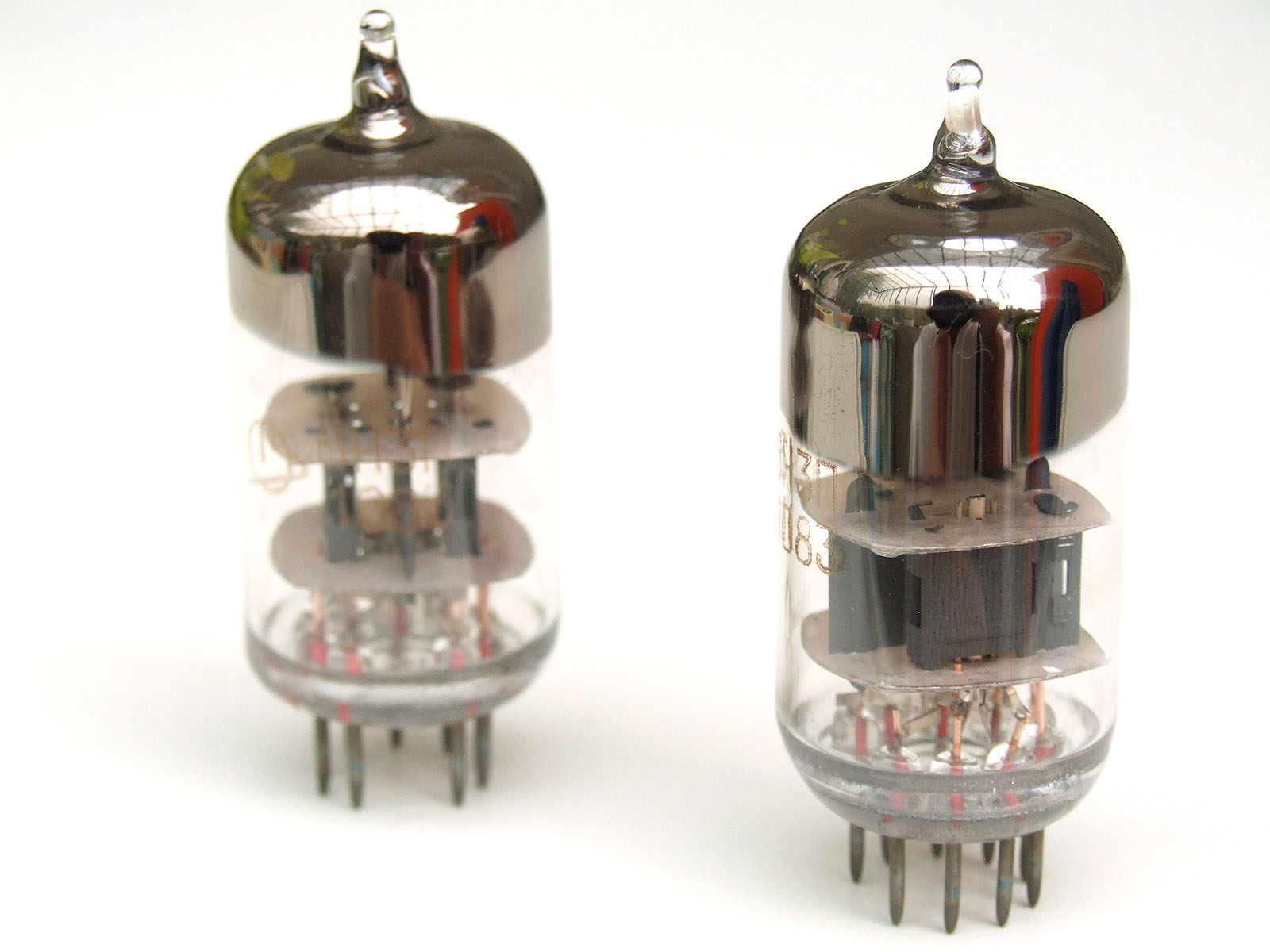
6N3P vacuum tubes USSR

The 6N3P (Russian: 6Н3П) is a Russian-made direct equivalent of the 2C51 medium gain dual triode vacuum tube. It may be used as an amplifier, mixer, oscillator or multivibrator over a frequency range AF through VHF. The Russian tube is slightly larger in size than the American tube.

== Basic data ==
(per each triode)

Uf = 6.3 V, If = 350 mA, μ = 36, Ia = 7.7 mA, S = 4.9 mA/V, Pa = 1.5 W

== History of use ==
6N3P was widely used for FM band radio input unit stages (nearly all 1960s Soviet radios with FM band employed the same input unit on a separate sub-chassis). Currently it has found use in DIY preamps. A ruggedized/industrial version of the tube is designated 6N3P-EV (Russian: 6Н3П-ЕВ).

== Chinese 6N3 ==
eBay has proliferated with pre-amps apparently from Hong Kong that are largely populated with the 6N3, which is said to be the Chinese version of the 6N3P. The 6N3Ps are newly made (unlike the Soviet "new old stock," and the pre-amps appear to be the product of a cottage hifi industry).

== See also ==
- 6N1P
- 6N2P
- 12AT7
