= 5751 =

5751 is the designation for a low-voltage, low-noise avionics vacuum tube popular as a pre-amplification tube in guitar amplifiers. The 5751 is a modified version of the 12AX7 and, having a gain factor of 70-80 (as opposed to the 12AX7's 100), is used to "soften up a harsh modern amp".
