= Faithful amplification =

Electronic amplification of a signal

In electronics, faithful amplification is the amplification of a signal, particularly a weak one, by a triode or a transistor such that the signal changes in amplitude but not in shape. In order to achieve this with a bipolar transistor, the transistor is biased. Faithful amplification can only occur on transistors with a forward biased emitter-base junction, a reverse biased collector-base junction, and proper zero signal collector current. Without the correct bias, the transistor will not operate efficiently and cause its output to distort.
