= Stanley R. Mullard =

Stanley Robert Mullard (1 November 1883 – 1 September 1979) was an English industrialist who founded the Mullard electronics company.

== Early life ==
Stanley Mullard was born in Bermondsey, London in 1883, the son of Robert Mullard and his wife Ann, née Ludford. He joined the Mackey Electric Lamp Company Ltd in 1899, and became a director of the company in 1906.

Mullard joined the IEE as a student member in 1903, became a full member in 1910, and a fellow of the IEE in 1928.

In 1909, following the bankruptcy of the Mackey company, Mullard went to work first for a lamp company in Paris, and then joined the Ediswan company in Ponders End, north London, where in 1913 he was put in charge of the lamp laboratory.

During World War I, Mullard was commissioned as a captain in the Royal Naval Volunteer Reserve and served at HMS Vernon as a research engineer, helping to develop high power valves made from silica rather than glass.

== Mullard Radio Valve Company ==
In September 1920, Mullard established the Mullard Radio Valve Company. The company moved to Hammersmith in 1921, followed by a move to Balham in 1923. Mullard ended up owning 6 factories. He said that all his money came from royalties from valves and other patents. In 1925, Mullard sold half the shares in the Mullard company to Philips, with the remainder of the company being acquired by Philips in 1927. Mullard remained as managing director of the Mullard company until his resignation in 1930. During the general strike, workers in his Lancashire factory either walked or rode to work. None struck. Mullard was noted for spending a great deal of his working time on the factory floors, garnering information from his workers about improving methods of production. If workers were not performing well, they would receive two weeks' holiday pay, and be expected to perform upon return. More senior management were given four weeks' leave of absence.
