= Valvo =

Valvo is a surname. Notable people with the surname include:

- Ángel Lo Valvo (1909–1978), Argentine racing driver
- Carmen Marc Valvo (born 1963), American fashion designer
- Michael Valvo (1942–2004), American chess player
