= 12AU7 =

Miniature medium-gain dual-triode vacuum tube

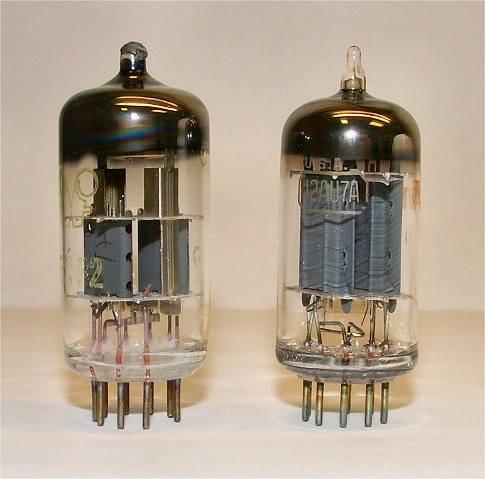
- RFT "thin-plate" ECC82 variant (left), RCA 12AU7A variant (right)
- Classification: Dual Triode
- Service: Audio amplifiers and TV receivers
- Height: 2 5/8 in (67 mm)
- Diameter: 7/8 in (22 mm)

Cathode
- Cathode type: Coated Unipotential
- Heater voltage: Series / Parallel; 12.6 / 6.3 V
- Heater current: Series / Parallel; 150 / 300 mA

Anode
- Max dissipation Watts: 2.75 W per section
- Max voltage: 300 V
- Max current: 20 mA (maximum)

Socket connections

References
- http://www.thetubestore.com/lib/thetubestore/eh-12au7eh.pdf

The 12AU7 and its variants are miniature nine-pin (B9A base) medium-gain dual-triode vacuum tubes. It belongs to a large family of dual-triode vacuum tubes which share the same pinout (RETMA 9A). 12AU7 is also known in Europe under its Mullard–Philips tube designation ECC82. There are many equivalent tubes with different names, some identical, some designed for ruggedness, long life, or other characteristics; examples are the US military 5814A and the European special-quality ECC802 and E82CC.

The tube is popular in hi-fi vacuum tube audio as a low-noise line amplifier, driver (especially for tone stacks), and phase-inverter in vacuum tube push–pull amplifier circuits. It was widely used, in special-quality versions such as 5814A, in pre-semiconductor digital computer circuitry. Use of special-quality versions outside of the purpose they were designed for may not be optimal; for example, a version for digital computers may be designed for long life without cathode poisoning when mostly switched to low-current mode in switching applications, but with little attention to parameters of interest only for linear applications such as linearity of transfer characteristic, matching between the two sections, microphony, etc.

This tube is essentially two 6C4/EC90s in the same envelope. However, this latter type is officially described in manufacturer's data as "a special quality R.F. power amplifier or oscillator for frequencies up to 150 MHz". The 12AU7, on the other hand, is described as an "A.F. double triode". Data sheets suggest an upper frequency limit of 30 kHz for the 12AU7/ECC82 and it is not described as a "special quality" device. This contrasts with the 6AB4/EC92 and 12AT7/ECC81 which are both R.F. devices operating up to VHF.

Double triodes of the 12AU7 family have a center-tapped filament for use in either 6.3V 300mA or 12.6V 150mA heater circuits.

It was also widely used in television applications, mostly as line timebase oscillator, frame timebase oscillator, in some cases as gated automatic gain control, synchronisation separator, limiter, or, in some later colour sets, as relay tube, to turn off high voltage tube driver in case one of line failure or frame failure, to protect the picture tube, in the case of television where high voltage was generated separate from the line timebase.

As of 2012 the 12AU7 continued to be manufactured in Russia, Slovakia (JJ Electronic), and China.

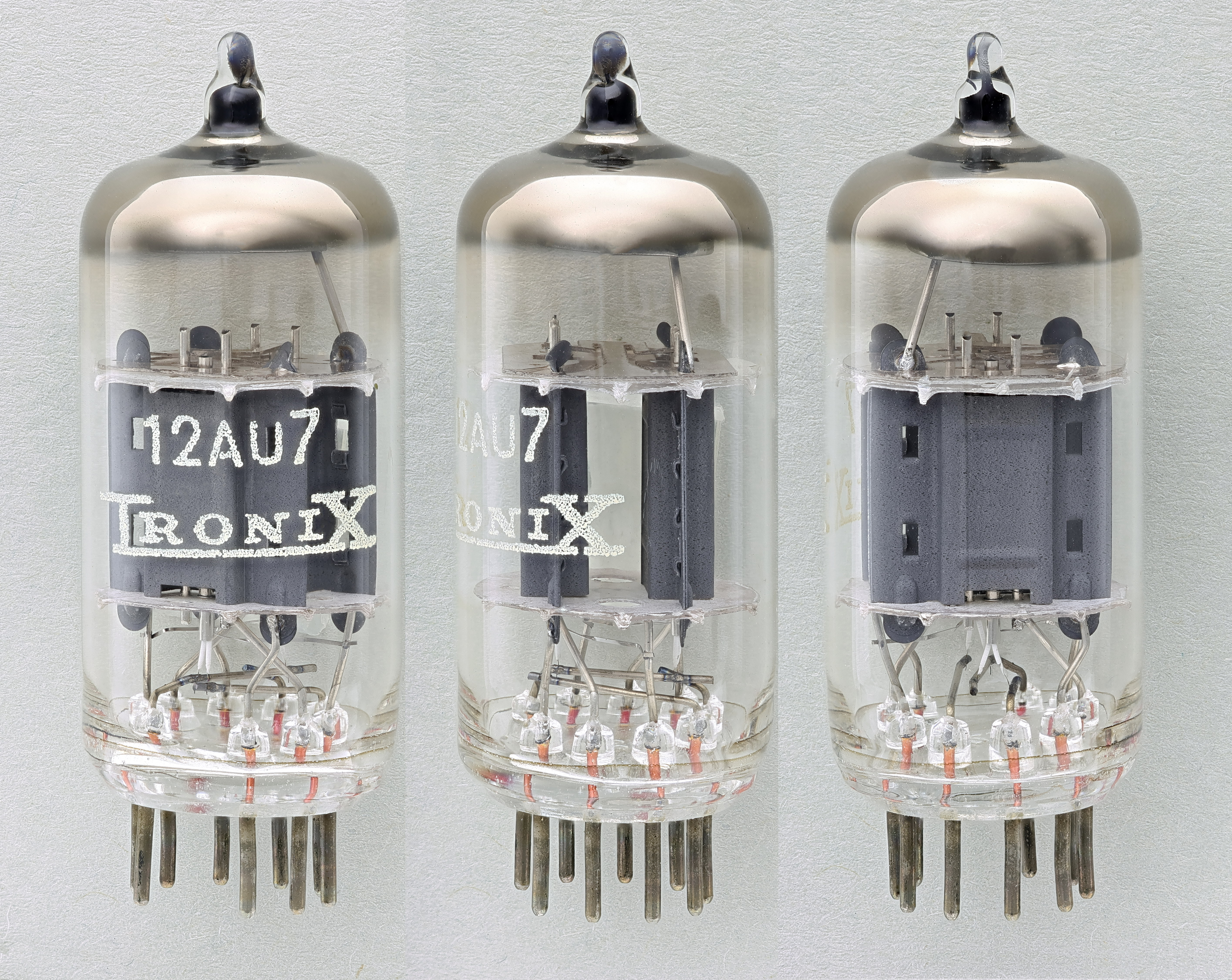
Tronix 12AU7

== See also ==
- 12AX7 - includes a comparison of similar twin-triode designs
- 12AT7
