= 12AT7 =

Miniature medium-gain dual triode vacuum tube

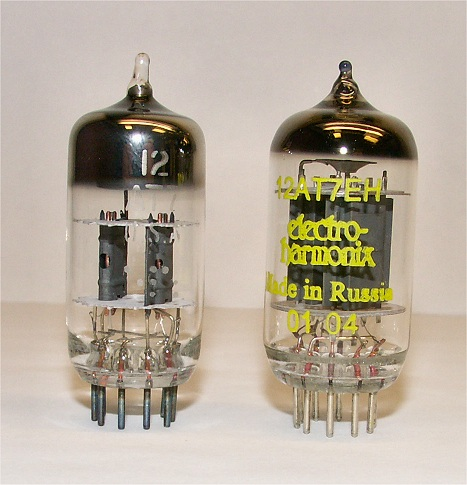
Old production General Electric "narrow plate" 12AT7 (left) and current production "long plate" Electro-Harmonix 12AT7 (right)

12AT7 (also known in Europe by the Mullard–Philips tube designation of ECC81) is a miniature nine-pin medium-gain (60) dual-triode vacuum tube popular in guitar amplifiers. It belongs to a large family of dual triode vacuum tubes which share the same pinout (EIA 9A), including in particular the very commonly used low-mu 12AU7 and high-mu 12AX7.

The 12AT7 has somewhat lower voltage gain than the 12AX7, but higher transconductance and plate current, which makes it suitable for high-frequency applications.

Originally the tube was intended for operation in VHF circuits, such as TV sets and FM tuners, as an oscillator/frequency converter, but it also found wide use in audio as a driver and phase-inverter in vacuum tube push–pull amplifier circuits.

In television applications, beside the tuner section, it was used just like 12AU7, in vertical and horizontal time base, as line and frame oscillator, relay tube, separator, limiter and also as keyed and gated automatic gain control.

This tube is essentially two 6AB4/EC92s in a single envelope. Unlike the situation with the 6C4 and 12AU7, both the 6AB4 and the 12AT7 are described by manufacturer's data sheets as R.F. (Radio Frequency) devices operating up to VHF frequencies.

The tube has a center-tapped filament so it can be used in either 6.3V 300mA or 12.6V 150mA heater circuits. If 100 mA was needed, radio manufacturers were using two UC92, as ECC81 had no 100 mA versions.

In Europe it was replaced by ECC85, which has almost the same specifications, but it has a higher heater current, ( 0.45 A at 6.3 V), and heater is only between pins 4 and 5, unlike ECC81. Pin 9 has internal connection to a screen. For series connection it is available as the 300 mA version PCC85 for television use and 100 mA version UCC85 for universal power supply radios.

As of 2012 the 12AT7 was manufactured in Russia (Electro-Harmonix brand), Slovakia (JJ Electronic), and China.

== See also ==
- 12AU7
- 12AX7 - includes a comparison of similar twin-triode designs
- List of vacuum tubes
