= 12AX7 =

Miniature high-gain dual triode vacuum tube

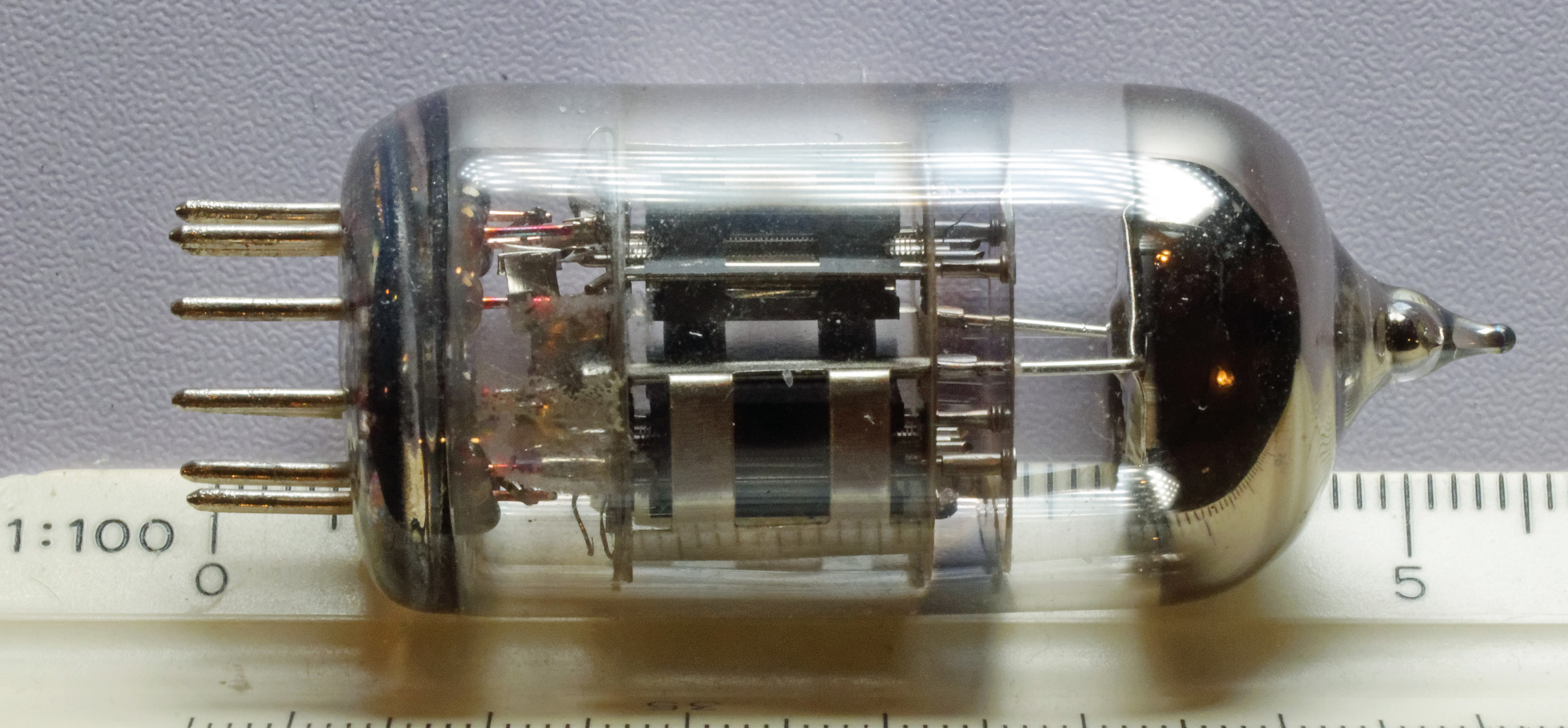
- 12AX7
- Classification: Dual triode
- Service: Class-A amplifier
- Height: 2.2 in (56 mm)
- Diameter: 0.8 in (20 mm)

Cathode
- Cathode type: Indirectly heated
- Heater voltage: 12.6 V (series); 6.3 V (parallel)
- Heater current: 150 mA (series); 300 mA (parallel)

Anode
- Max dissipation Watts: 1 per section
- Max voltage: 300 V

Socket connections

Typical class-A amplifier operation
- Amplification factor: 100
- Anode voltage: 250 V
- Anode current: 1.2 mA
- Bias voltage: −2 V
- Anode resistance: 62.5 kΩ

References
- Sylvania 12AX7 datasheet

12AX7 (also known as ECC83) is a miniature dual-triode vacuum tube with high voltage gain. Developed around 1946 by RCA engineers in Camden, New Jersey, under developmental number A-4522, it was released for public sale under the 12AX7 identifier on September 15, 1947.

The 12AX7 was originally intended as replacement for the 6SL7 family of dual-triode amplifier tubes for audio applications. As a popular choice for guitar tube amplifiers, its ongoing use in such legacy equipment makes it one of the few small-signal vacuum tubes in continuous production since it was introduced.

== History ==
The 12AX7 is a twin triode basically composed of two of the triodes from a 6AV6, a double diode triode. The 6AV6 is a miniature repackaging (with just a single cathode) of the triode and twin diodes from the octal 6SQ7 (a double-diode triode used in AM radios), which itself is very similar to the older type 75 triode-diode dating from 1930.

== Application ==
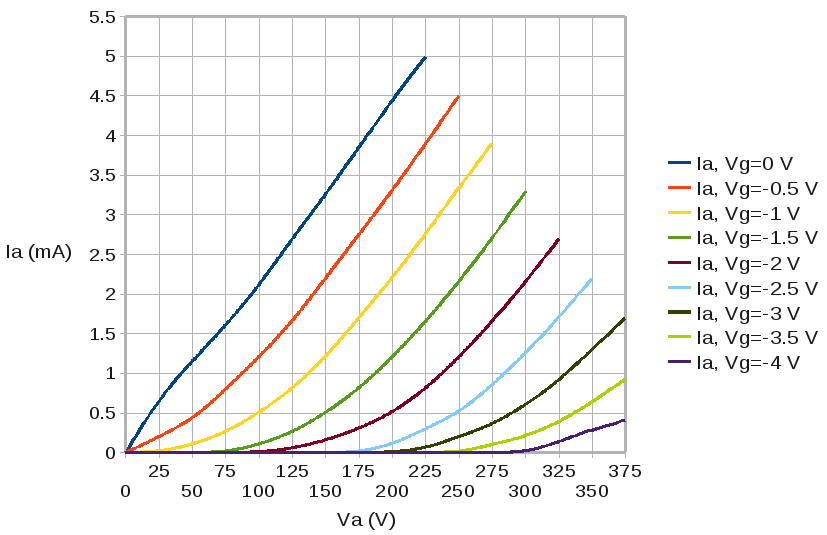
Anode current characteristic with grid voltage as parameter

The 12AX7 is a high-gain (typical amplification factor 100), low-plate-current triode best suited for low-level audio voltage amplification. In this role it is widely used for the preamplifier (input and mid-level) stages of audio amplifiers. It has relatively high Miller capacitance, making it unsuitable for radio-frequency use.

Typically a 12AX7 triode is configured with a high-value plate resistor, 100 kohms in most guitar amps and 220 kΩ or more in high-fidelity equipment. Grid bias is most often provided by a cathode resistor. If the cathode resistor is unbypassed, negative feedback is introduced and each half of a 12AX7 provides a typical voltage gain of about 30; the amplification factor is basically twice the maximum stage gain, as the plate impedance must be matched. Thus half the voltage is across the tube at rest, half across the load resistor. The cathode resistor can be bypassed to reduce or eliminate AC negative feedback and thereby increase gain; maximum gain is about 60 times with a 100k plate load, and a center biased and bypassed cathode, and higher with a larger plate load.

$A_v = \mu \times R_{tot} /(r_P + R_{tot} + (R_K \times (\mu + 1))$

Where $A_v$ = voltage gain, $\mu$ is the amplification factor of the valve, $r_P$ is the internal plate resistance, $R_K$ is the cathode resistor and $R_{tot}$ is the parallel combination of $R_P$ (external plate resistor) and $R_{load}$. If the cathode resistor is bypassed, use $R_K = 0$.

The initial “12” in the designator implies a 12-volt heater requirement; however, the tube has a center-tapped heater so it can be used in either 6.3-V or 12.6-V heater circuits.

== Similar twin-triode designs ==
The 12AX7 is the most common member of what eventually became a large family of twin-triode vacuum tubes, manufactured all over the world, all sharing the same pinout (EIA 9A). Most use heaters which can be optionally wired in series (12.6V, 150 mA) or parallel (6.3V, 300 mA). Other tubes, which in some cases can be used interchangeably in an emergency or for different performance characteristics, include the 12AT7, 12AU7, 12AV7, 12AY7, and the low-voltage 12U7, plus many four-digit EIA series dual triodes. They span a wide range of voltage gain and transconductance. Different versions of each were designed for enhanced ruggedness, low microphonics, stability, lifespan, etc.

Those other designs offer lower voltage gain (traded off for higher plate current) than the 12AX7 (which has a voltage gain or $A_v$ of 100), and are more suitable for high-frequency applications.

Some American designs similar to the 12AX7:

- 12AD7 (October 10, 1955 - 225mA heater - low hum)
- 12AT7 (May 20, 1947, dual 6AB4, $A_v$ = 60)
- 12AU7 (October 18, 1946, dual 6C4, $A_v$ = 17-20)
- 12AV7 (February 14, 1950 - dual 6BC4, $A_v$ = 37-41)
- 12AX7 (September 15, 1947 - dual 6DR4, also like octal 6SL7, $A_v$ = 100) dual 12AV6 (6AV6)
- 12AY7 (December 7, 1948 - $A_v$ = 44, for audio preamp use)
- 12AZ7 (March 2, 1951 - 225mA heater, $A_v$ = 60)
- 12DF7 ($A_v$ = 100, low microphonics)
- 12DT7 ($A_v$ = 100)
- 12DW7 (First triode: $A_v$ = 100, Second triode: $A_v$ = 17)
- 12U7 ($A_v$ = 20, for use in automotive radios on 12-volt plate supply)

Although commonly known in Europe by its Mullard–Philips tube designation of ECC83, other European variations also exist including the low-noise versions 12AX7A, 12AD7, 6681, 7025, and 7729; European versions B339, B759, CV492, CV4004, CV8156, CV8222, ECC803, ECC803S, E2164, and M8137; and the lower-gain low-noise versions 5751 and 6851, intended for avionics equipment.

In European usage special-quality valves of some sort were often indicated by exchanging letters and digits in the name: the E83CC was a special-quality ECC83. In the US a "W" in the designation, as in 12AX7WA, designates the tube as complying with military grade, higher reliability specifications.

The 'E' in the European designation classifies this as having a 6.3 volt heater, whereas the American designation of 12AX7 classifies it as having a 12.6 volt heater. It can, of course, be wired for operation off either voltage.

== Manufacturers ==
As of 2022 versions of the 12AX7/ECC83 are available from the following manufacturers:

- In Russia: New Sensor, which produces tubes under the Sovtek, Electro-Harmonix, Svetlana, Tung-Sol, and Mullard brands
- In Slovakia: JJ Electronic (annual production of approximately two million units) [citation needed]
- In China: Hengyang Electronics, Tubes sold under Psvane and TAD brand names. Company owns its independent manufacturing facility in Southern China (former Guiguang tube factory) and recently they acquired former small signal tube manufacturing line from Tianjin Quanzheng factory (TJ Full Music)

== Gallery ==
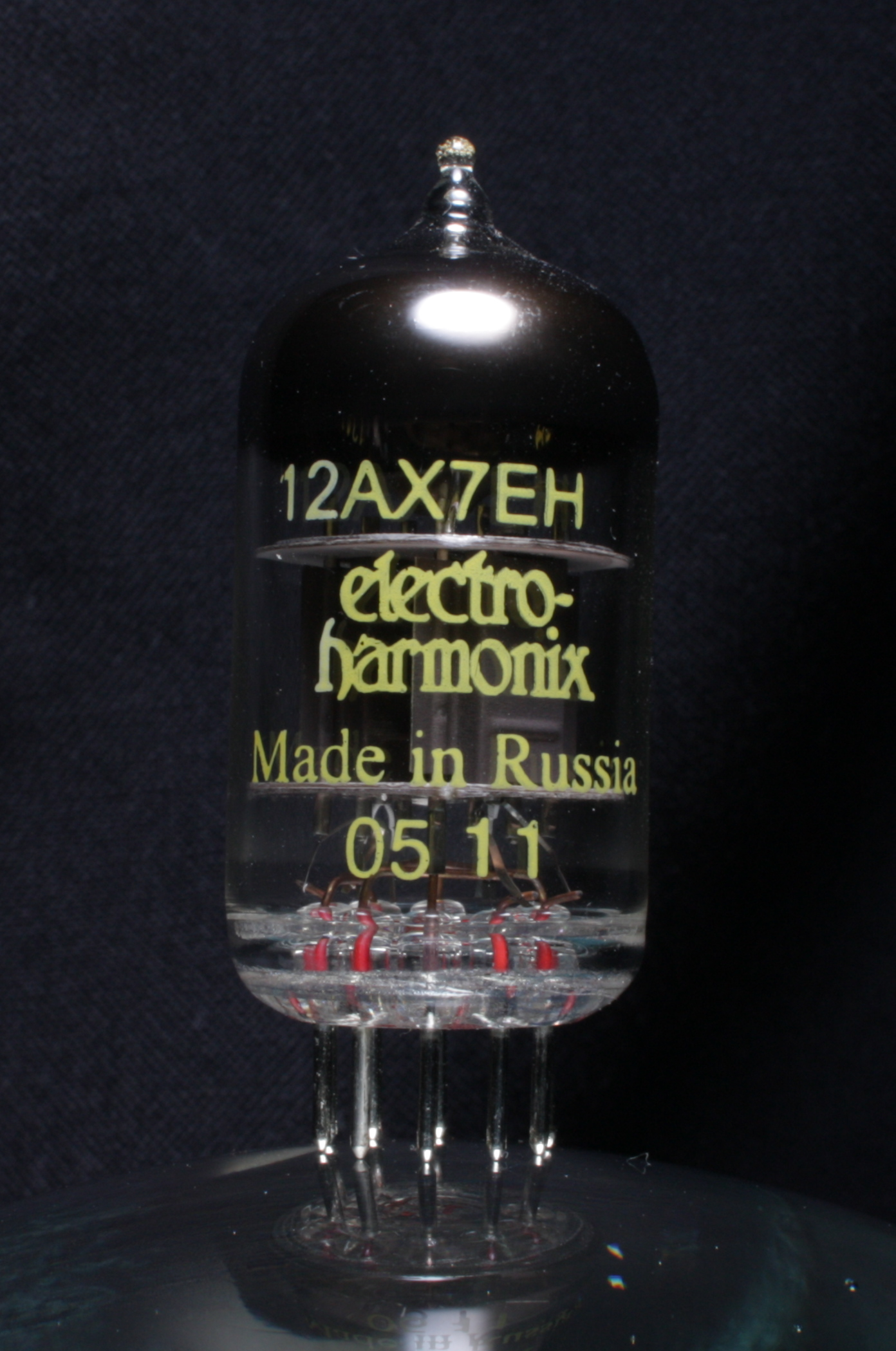
Electro-Harmonix 12AX7EH

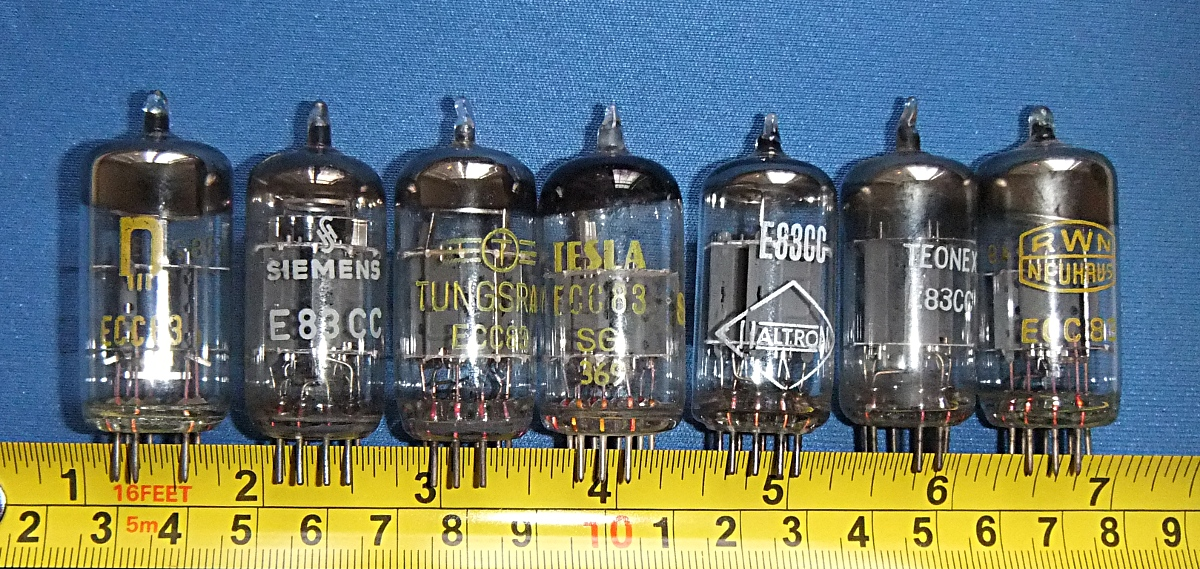
Various brands of 12AX7, with measuring tape to indicate size

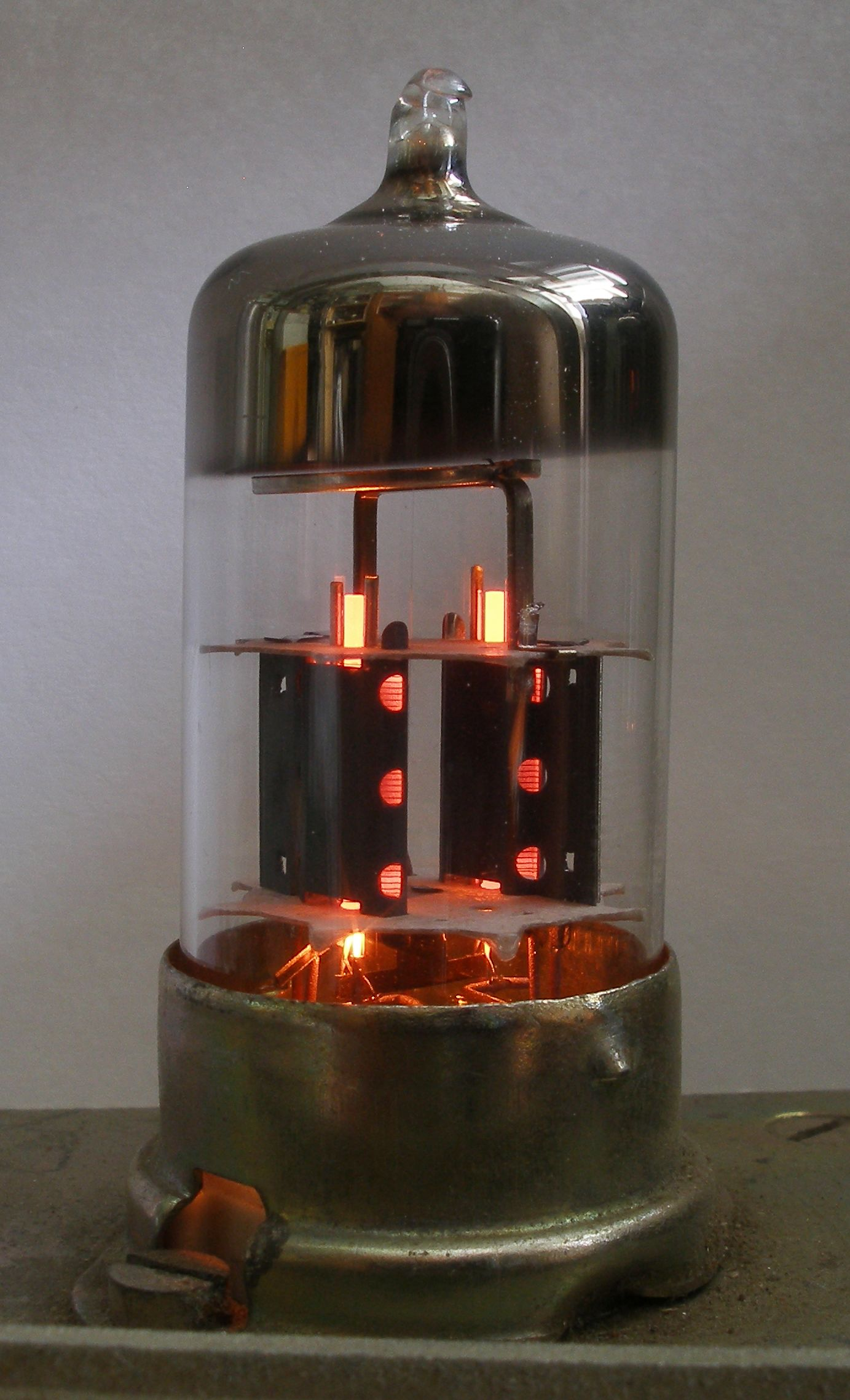
Tungsram ECC83 during operation

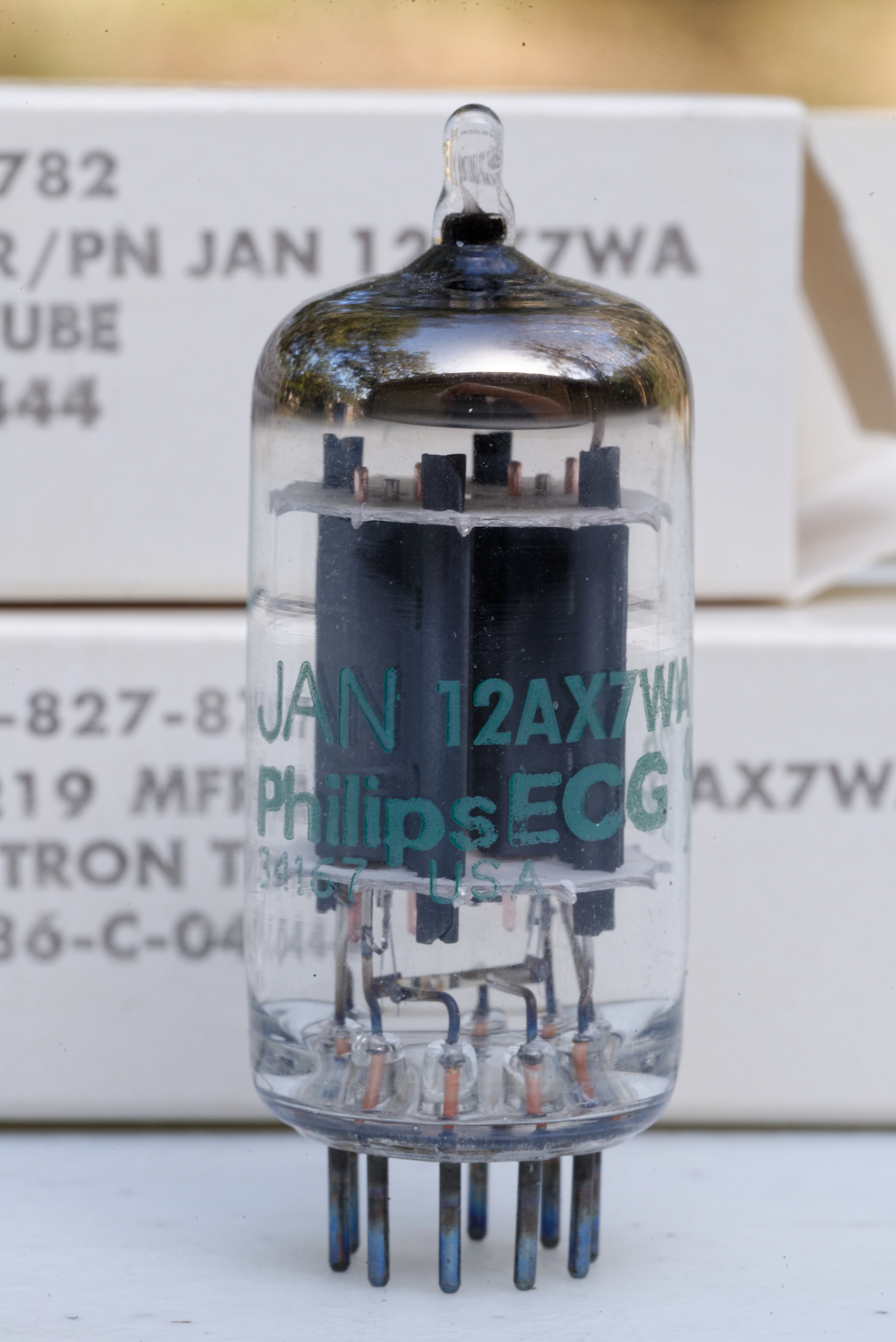
Philips JAN 12AX7WA (Joint Army Navy)

== See also ==
- List of vacuum tubes
