= LEAK Sandwich =

Loudspeaker brand

The LEAK Sandwich was an innovative loudspeaker design introduced by the English hi-fi company H. J. Leak & Co. in 1961. Harold Leak engaged Don Barlow, who had devised a way of making the cone of the loudspeaker from expanded polystyrene foam sandwiched between two sheets of aluminium foil. This made it both very light and extremely stiff, and correspondingly accurate in sound.

A publicity photograph showed Harold Leak standing on top of one of his sandwich cones to demonstrate its exceptional rigidity. The speaker was innovative in other ways as well and was produced, relatively unchanged, for about 10 years.

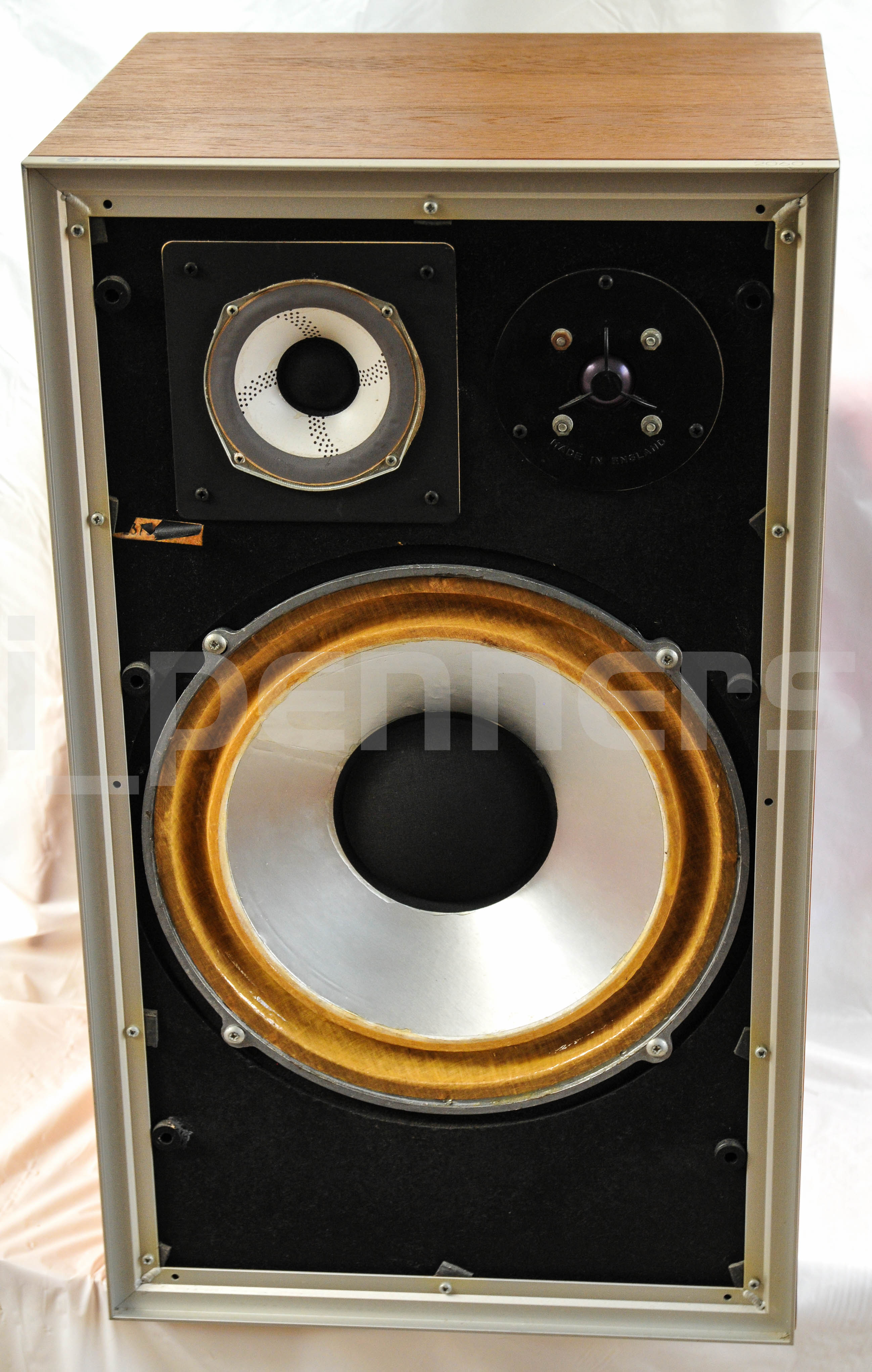
LEAK 2060 loudspeaker with a sandwich cone woofer

The original Leak 'Sandwich' hi-fi speaker was a large two-way system employing a 330 mm (13 in) low frequency element, with the sandwich cone, cambric roll suspension, and cast aluminium chassis. As was common at the time, the 75 mm (3 in) high frequency unit was a miniature version of the woofer, and was mounted onto the grille assembly, so fitted neatly into its own foam lined cavity on the face of the 60-litre (2.1 ft^{3}) bass enclosure. A large wood block was bolted between the back of the woofer magnet and the back panel of the enclosure, as a structural brace, a technique later used by other manufacturers. Crossover network components were attached onto three sides of this block. Since it was designed for use with valve (tube) amplifiers, the system was rated at 15 Ohms.

The 'Sandwich 200' model had a 200 mm (8 in) version of Barlow's foam-and-foil sandwich driver, together with two 60 mm (2.4 in) purple Mylar coned elements, one employed as a midrange, and the other as a tweeter. This smaller model was a great commercial and critical success for Leak, and was produced for some years. Since transistorized amplifiers had become more common by this time, it was rated at a more contemporary 4 to 8 Ohms, with power handling of 18 watts.

The Sandwich cone woofer was also used in the later 2060, as the low frequency element of a three-way system.
