= Fender amplifier =

Brand of guitar amplifiers

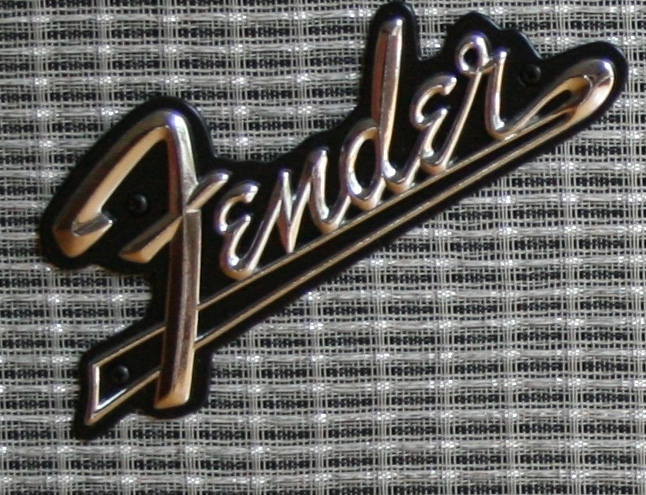
Fender amp "tailed" logo

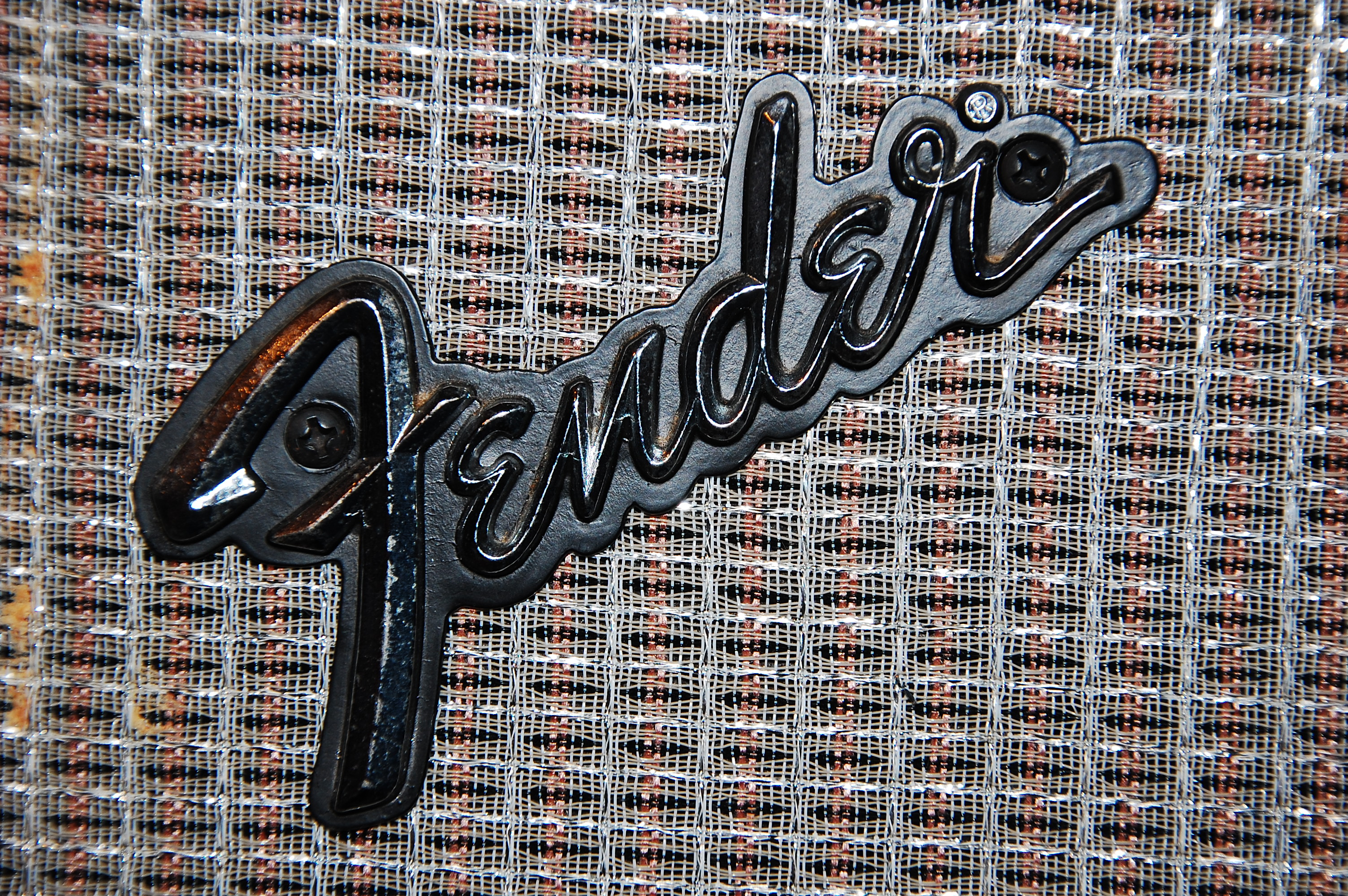
Fender amp "tailless" logo

Fender amplifiers are electric instrument amplifiers produced by the Fender Musical Instruments Corporation. The first guitar amplifiers attributed to Leo Fender were manufactured by the K&F Manufacturing Corporation (K&F) in 1945. Later, Fender began building its own line of electric guitars. Fender amplifiers would become favorites of guitarists like Jimi Hendrix, Eric Clapton, and Stevie Ray Vaughan, also known in these cases for playing Fender guitars.

Fender amps have come in many configurations and styles. The early K&F and Fender amplifiers relied upon vacuum tube circuitry, with solid-state models appearing in the late 1960s. Fender frequently updated the internal circuitry of its amps, and changed their appearance throughout its history.

== Early amplifiers: K&F, Woodie and Tweed ==
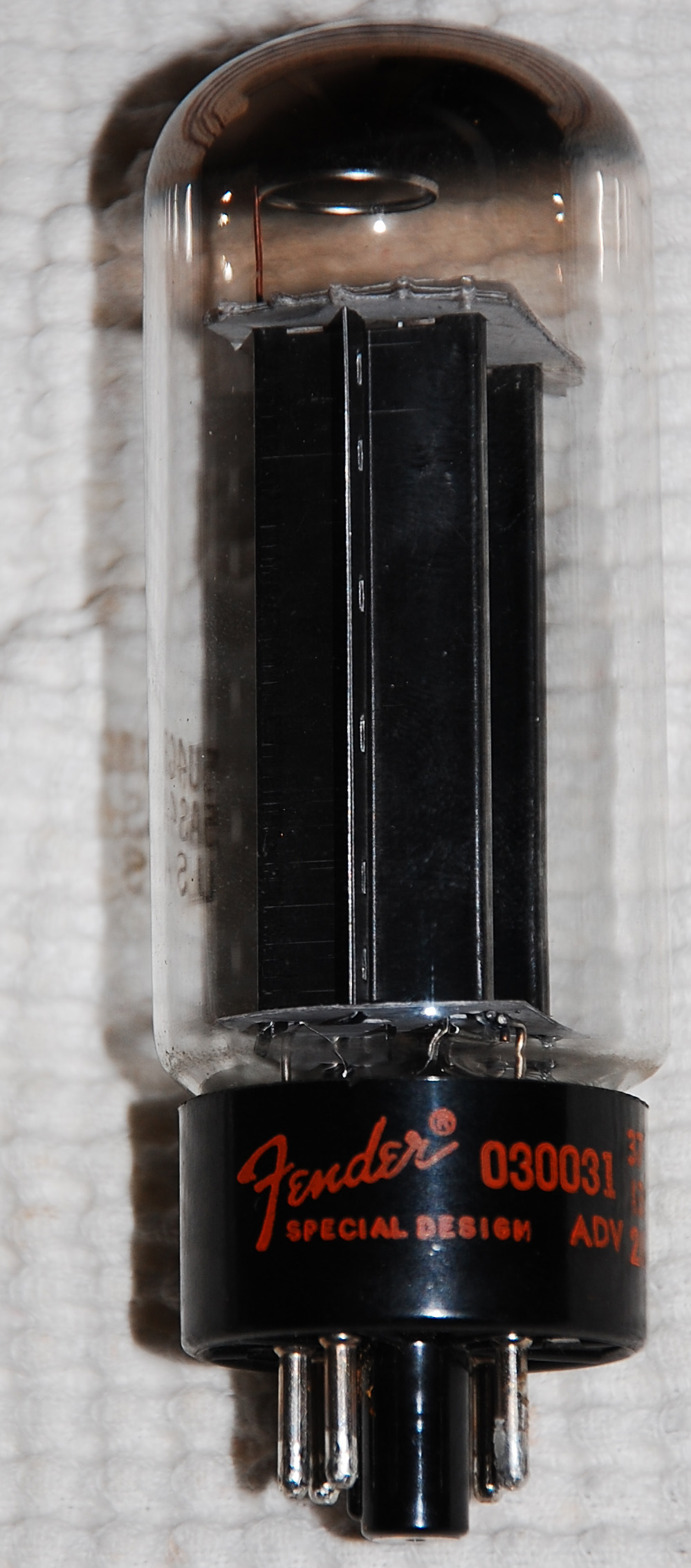
Fender branded vacuum tube

The first "Fender" amplifiers were manufactured by Leo Fender and Doc Kauffman, doing business as the K&F Manufacturing Corporation. The amplifiers were housed in a steel case and most were finished in a "gray crinkle" finish that was baked in the Kauffman family oven. They were made in three sizes: 1×8" (one 8-inch speaker), 1×10", and 1×15". They are all very rare today and few have survived.

The first amplifiers made in-house by the Fender Electric Instrument Company were a significant step up in size and function to the small, nameless amps that preceded them, however, they didn't have technological advancements such as circuit boards in their designs. They were constructed out of spare hardwood held by the Fender company at the time and were hence given the name 'woodie' later on by collectors. These amps were the Princeton, the Deluxe and the Professional. The Princeton was a small six watt amp with an 8" Jensen field-coil speaker. This amp had no controls as it was designed for the guitar to solely control the volume and was simply turned on by plugging/unplugging into the wall receptacle. The Deluxe was a larger amp with a Jensen 10” field-coil speaker and five tubes in a 14-watt design. It was the most popular amp of this era, with most amps surviving from this era today being Deluxes. The rarest of all the original 'woodie' series was the Professional. It was the largest of the trio featuring Jensen 15" field-coil speaker and six tubes delivering 25 watts of power.

The production of these first amps ceased in 1948; however, their names have remained in use with new Fender amplifier lines.

In 1948 Fender entered a new phase of amplifier construction dubbed 'the tweed phase'. This phase saw the company drape their amplifiers in a cloth covering, which consists of varnished cotton twill. This is incorrectly called tweed because of its feel and appearance (actual tweed is a rough woolen fabric). The amps made during this period were a considerable leap forward for Fender, and they are often praised for their sound and their circuitry. Fender generally stopped using the twill covering in 1960, though the Harvard was still covered in twill until 1963, and the Champ until 1964.

At the beginning of the "tweed" era, Fender constructed many of its cabinets in "TV front" style, amps which bore a strong resemblance to TVs of the time. In 1955 they shifted to the "wide panel" design, a more conventional design where the top and bottom panels are wider than the side. Fender later constructed them with "narrow panel", in which all the panels have more or less the same width.

== Brownface (Brown and Blonde) ==
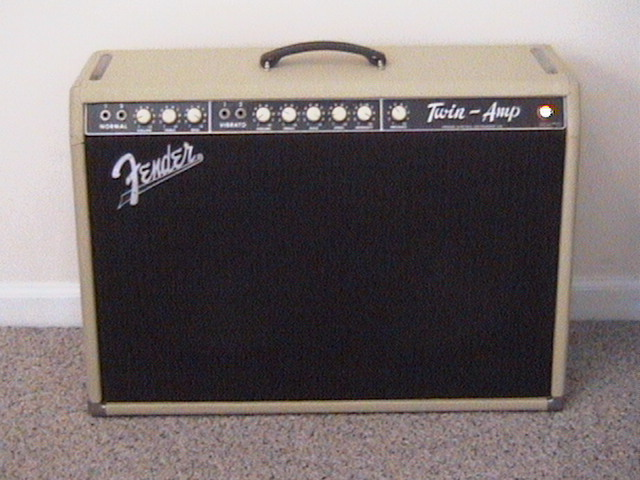
Blonde twin, 1963

The Brownface series was introduced in 1959. The name 'brownface' stems from the brown-colored control panels, common to both the brown- and cream/blonde- Tolex-covered amps. The brownface amps originally featured a dark maroon or "oxblood" grillcloth, which was changed to "wheat" in 1962-63.

The shift from tweed to Tolex occurred in limited production in 1960. The tolex on the earliest versions in this era was pinkish brown and rough textured. There were only six amplifiers covered in tolex originally, the Professional Series: Bandmaster, Concert, Pro, Super, Twin (production halted Feb-May 1960, resumed as the blonde Twin) and Vibrasonic. The cheaper student models (Champ, Harvard, Princeton) remained tweed-covered until later in the decade. The 1x10" Harvard was discontinued in 1961(though in 1962-63 Fender built a small number of "Harvards" which were actually assembled from leftover tweed-Princeton parts given Harvard nameplates). The 1x8" Champ remained tweed-covered until 1963 when it made the change to black tolex, and the Princeton acquired its brown tolex in 1962 along with a complete redesign that saw it adopt more powerful twin-6v6 circuit and a larger speaker: 1x10".

The first tolex cover used by Fender was a light brown one matched with dark maroon or "oxblood" grillcloth. This look didn't last long and by 1961 Fender was using a darker brown tolex which remained commonplace until 1963. There were three different grillcloth colors used during this period: wheat, brown, and maroon. Fender used various grillcloth and tolex combinations, suggesting that they were using up whatever stock was on hand instead of assigning one combination to one amp consistently.

Accomplishments for the company's amplifier division during these years include the introduction of the stand-alone spring reverb unit in 1961, followed by incorporation of the reverb circuit within a combo-amp design with the 1963 Vibroverb. Other changes include the shift of the top-of-the-line model from the traditional Twin to include other models, like the Vibrasonic in early 1960, as well as the blonde Showman in 1961. Fender began using silicon rectifiers to reduce heat and voltage sag caused by tube rectifiers, and introduced an all-new, very complex Tremolo circuit (or, as it referred by Fender, "vibrato").

== Blackface ==
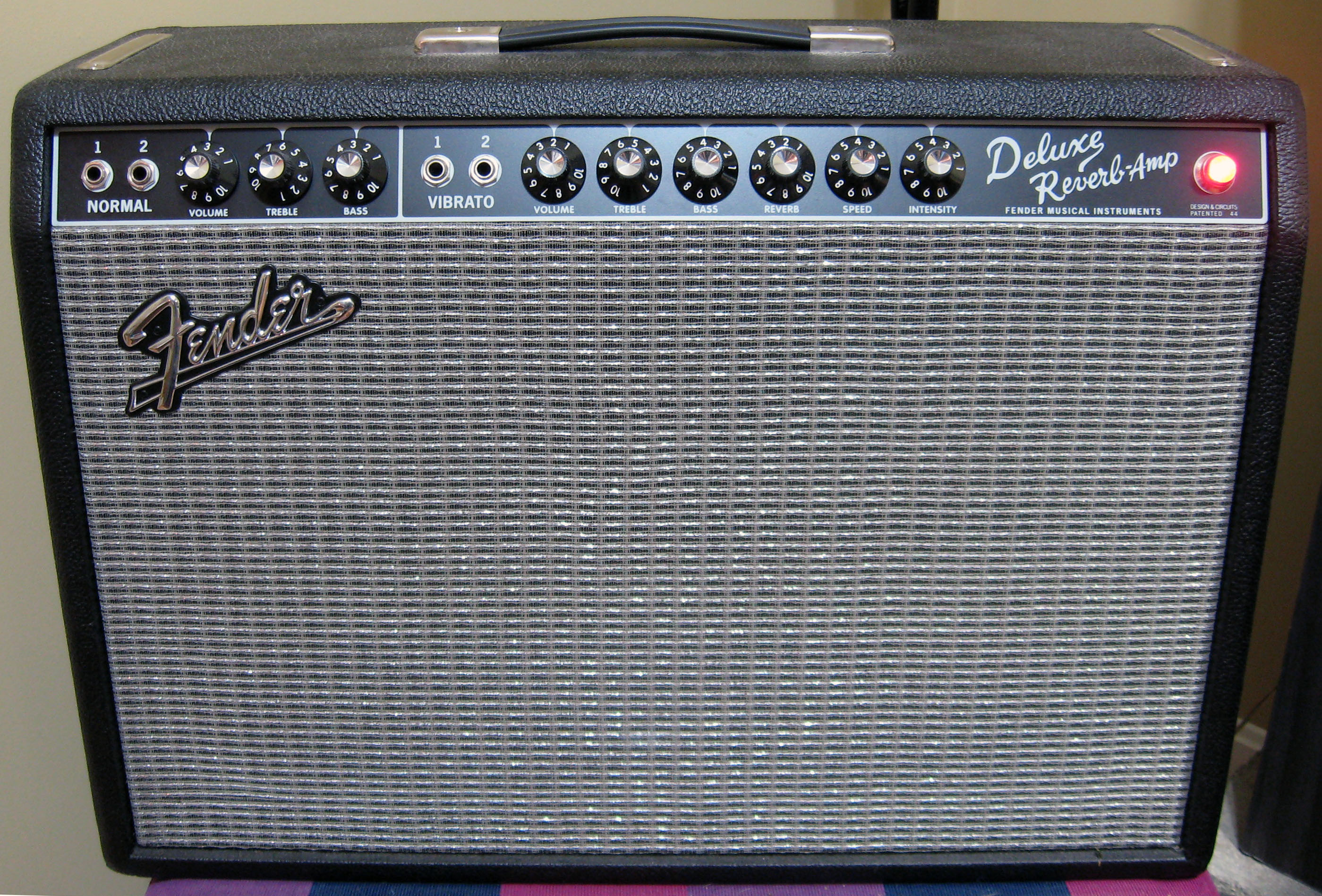
Blackface Deluxe Reverb

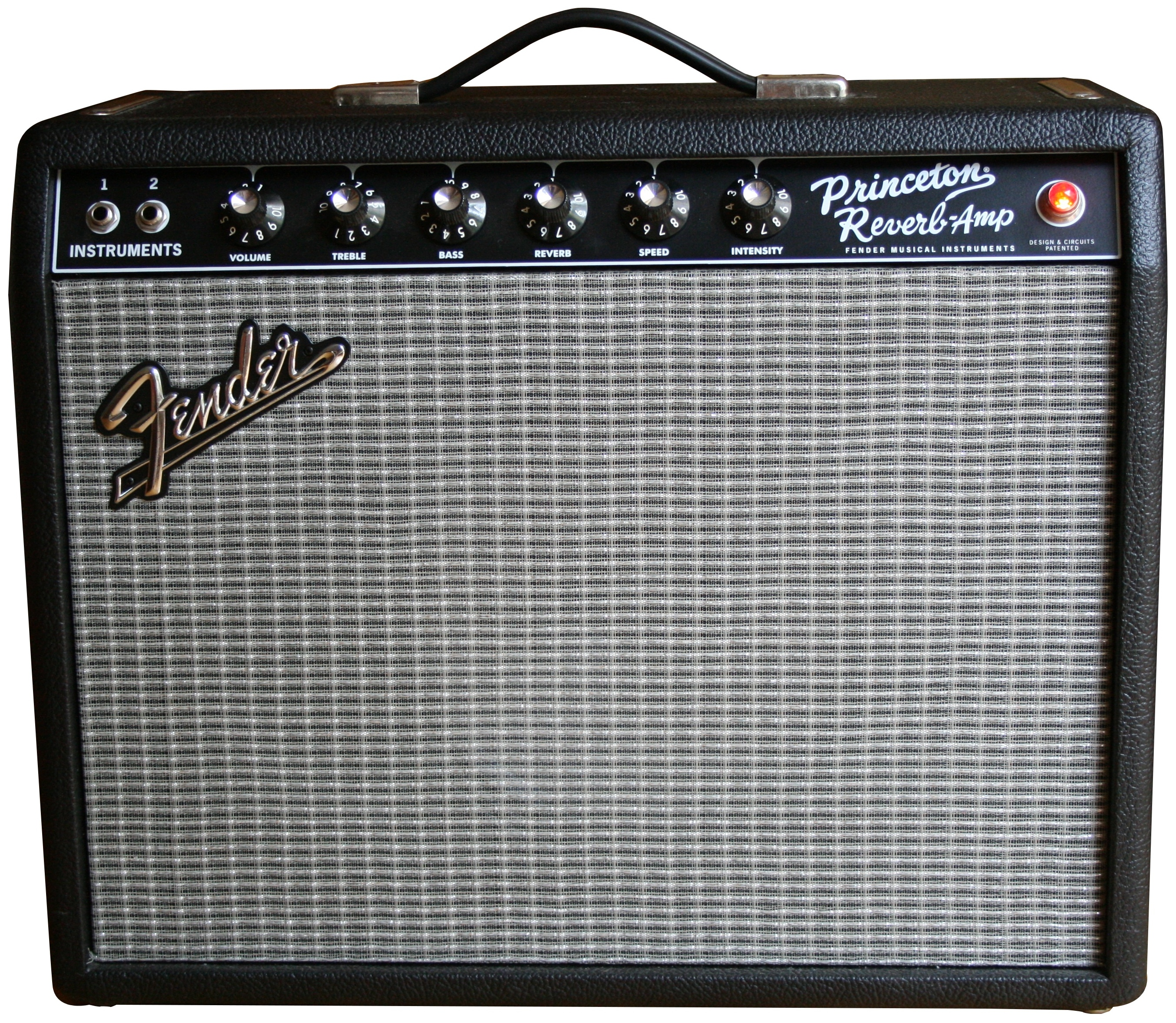
Blackface Princeton Reverb

The Blackface amplifiers were produced between 1963 and mid 1968 with the earliest blackface piggyback and large combo amps (Twin) having bodies covered in blonde tolex, with the new black control panel. The white control knobs continued briefly before giving way to black skirted "hat shaped" numbered knobs. These amps had new circuitry featuring bright switches.

Blackfaced cosmetics do not necessarily mean "pre-CBS" since the CBS company takeover took place in 1965 and amps with blackfaced cosmetics were produced up to 1967. After the buyout the front panels were changed from "Fender Electric Instrument Co." to "Fender Musical Instruments". No real changes were made to the amps until the silver faced amps of 1968 where certain circuit changes made them less desirable than the black faced amps. This affected some models more than others. For example, the Twin Reverb and Super Reverb combos, along with the Dual Showman Reverb and Bandmaster Reverb "piggyback" heads were equipped with a master volume control while other models such as the Deluxe Reverb were not altered in any way except for the change in cosmetics.

Silverface cosmetics do not necessarily denote silver face circuitry, however. Leo Fender was notorious for tweaking his designs. During the transitional period from late 1967 to mid-1968, the circuit designs of the Twin Reverb and Super Reverb were altered to eliminate an uncommon but serious oscillation in the signal chain. These changes took some months to finalize, as Leo worked through some designs, and happened after the cosmetic changes. Furthermore, the schematic and tube charts that shipped with these models did not always reflect the actual circuitry. Fender had many leftover AB763 (blackface) tube charts left over well into 1969 and shipped these charts with silverface models.

== Silverface ==
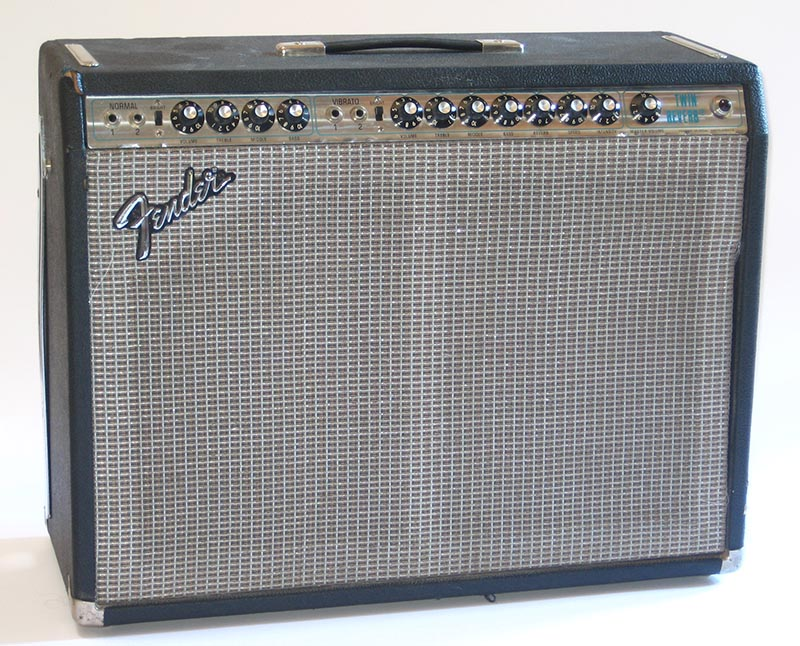
Silverface Twin Reverb, 1973

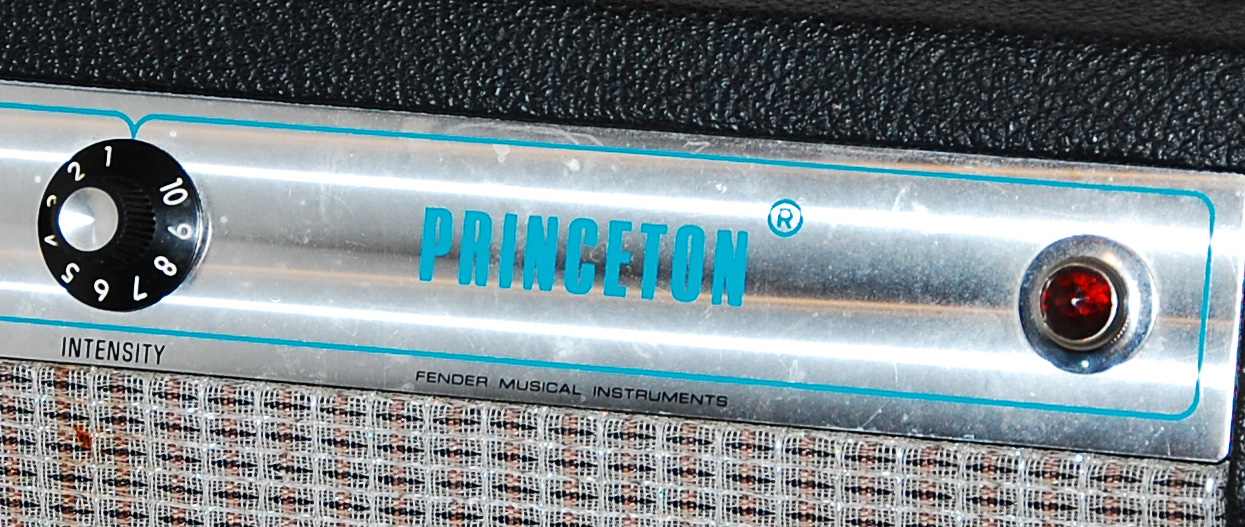
Silverface Princeton

Fender Silverface amplifiers were built between 1967 and 1981. They are often referred to as Silverface or Chromeface because of their brushed aluminum face plate.

The first Silverface amps, manufactured between 1967 and 1969, had an aluminum frame trim, known as a "drip edge" around the grillcloth. a "tailed" amp logo and the AB763 blackface circuit. An even rarer feature were the vertical, narrow black lines, which separated knob groups in the control panel. This cosmetic detail (later referred to as "blackline") was quickly abandoned. All of the Silverface amps generally had blue labels on the face plate, but in some rare exceptions (such as the Bronco) the colour was red instead. Some transitional models produced before the "tailless" period in 1973 featured the AC568 circuit.

In 1973 CBS changed the "tailed" Fender amp logo to the modern-looking "tailless" style (which was first introduced in 1967 on the student Bronco amp). A master volume knob and a pull-out "boost" pot were added on some amplifiers, followed by ultralinear output transformers and a "scripted tailless" amp decal featuring a "Made in USA" script in the bottom. Additionally in 1977, the power was increased between 70 and 135 watts on certain models.

All Silverface models usually came with a sparkling silver/blue grillcloth (some later models had a non-standard sparkling silver/orange grillcloth, and a black grillcloth was even fitted to some production runs). The Silverface control face plate was discontinued in 1981 and replaced by the second series of the blackface amps.

In 2013, Fender released the silverface '68 Custom amplifiers as a part of their Vintage Modified series, modeled after the original drip-edge silverfaced amps of 1968. Models included the Twin Reverb, Deluxe Reverb, Quad Reverb, and Princeton Reverb, and a Vibrolux Reverb was added to the line the following year. Each amp incorporates reverb and tremolo on both channels. Other features include a Custom channel (which has a modified Bassman tone stack giving modern players greater tonal flexibility with pedals), quicker gain onset and reduced negative feedback for greater touch sensitivity. The single-channel Pro Reverb and Vibro-Champ Reverb combos were introduced in January 12th, 2021.

== Prosonic ==
The Fender Prosonic guitar amplifier was produced by Fender Musical Instruments from 1996 to 2002. Available in head and combo versions, the Prosonic featured several departures in design from traditional Fender amplifiers such as the Bassman, Twin Reverb, and Deluxe Reverb. Designed by Bruce Zinky as a project for the Fender Custom Shop, the amplifier later had a non-Custom Shop production run at the Fender facilities in Corona, California. (Most contemporary Fender amplifiers are produced in Mexico.) It was initially priced to compete with buyers in the so-called boutique amplifier market who were seeking more distortion than any previous Fender had ever offered. It is believed that high list prices, and deviations from established Fender amplifier designs, swayed many buyers away from the Prosonic. It developed a cult following among serious guitarists, aided by the rise of musician-centric Internet communities.

== Early solid-state models ==
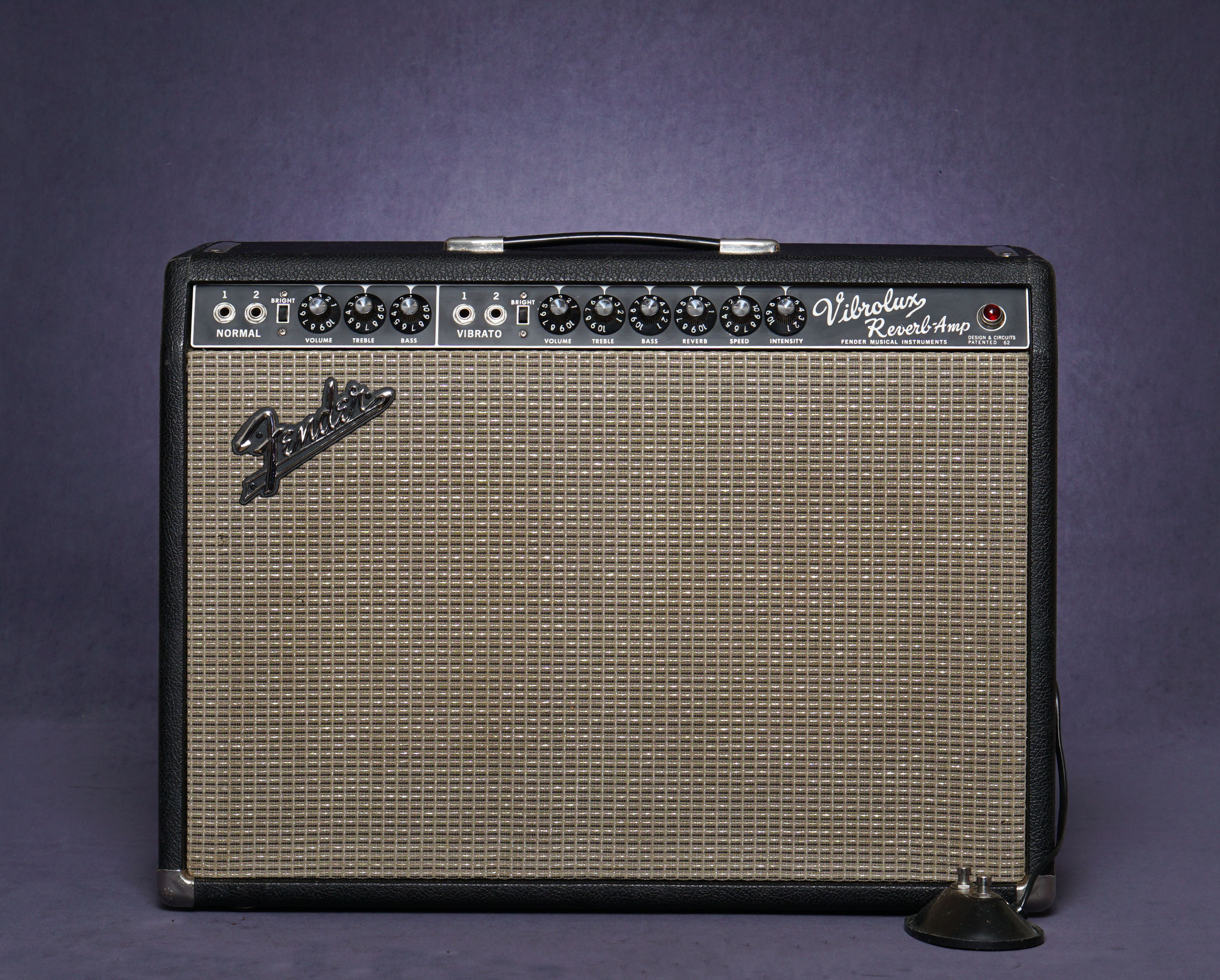
1966 Vibrolux Reverb

Fender's first transistor amplifiers were introduced in 1966. At the time they were the company's "flagship" range and aimed to make the tube-based designs obsolete. The amplifiers were naturally given traditional Fender model names, the earliest including 'Dual Showman', 'Twin Reverb', and 'Bassman'. Other products in the line were the 'Solid-State Reverb Unit' and the 'Solid-State Public-Address System'. 'Super Reverb', 'Pro Reverb', 'Vibrolux Reverb' and 'Deluxe Reverb' amplifiers followed in 1967.

The amplifiers were mainly designed by Robert "Bob" Rissi, Sawa Jacobson and Paul Spranger, who came up with the novel idea of making a heatsink to operate like a chimney to achieve increased and non-restricted airflow. Paul also designed the distinctive angled chassis and overall cosmetic styling. He was granted patents for both accounts.

In 1969 more transistor amplifiers were introduced, including the 'Zodiac' series and the behemoth 'Super Showman System'. Seth Lover, the legendary designer of the Gibson "P.A.F." pickup, and another former Gibson employee, Richard Chauncey Evans, were hired to help in designing the latter series, which consisted of an 'SS-1000' preamplifier head and 'XFL-1000' and 'XFL-2000' self-powered speaker cabinets. The head featured three cascadable channels, a "Dimension V" oil can delay effect, reverb, vibrato, and a fuzz. The powered cabinets could switch between normal and "tube-emulated" operation.

Zodiac-series amplifiers consisted of 'Capricorn', 'Scorpio', 'Taurus' and 'Libra' models. Aside from being covered with fake alligator skin, they were cosmetically very similar to the Super Showman. However, these were smaller combo amplifiers with fewer features and aimed for the lower end of the market.

Fender's early transistor amplifiers had an extensive marketing campaign but in the end they proved to be a major disaster. Many key executives of Fender had resigned after the CBS purchase and quality control of the PCB-constructed amps was rather sloppy during this time period. Reputedly many of the early solid-state amplifiers failed simply because employees didn't bother to clean up the soldering machines or attach the semiconductors properly to their heat sinks. The infancy of semiconductor technology also meant that many designs failed due to thermal runaway caused by insufficient cooling or lack of knowledge concerning "safe" power ratings of transistors. The cascaded effects from all this created a very poor reputation for the transistor products and the entire solid-state line was already discontinued by 1971. Additionally the experience also scared Fender away from solid-state amplifier technology for the next ten years.

One well known player who took to the Fender Solid State amps was Jan Akkerman who used Super Showman full stacks during the early years of his band Focus, favouring their clear sound. He used them well into the seventies, often in conjunction with Marshalls to add low end.

== Second series blackface ==
The Silverface amplifiers were succeeded by a new breed of Fender designs. Fender was now competing with manufacturers who were more in tune with the market; specifically, many guitar players were interested less in "cleanish" country amp and instead wanted more versatile tone controls and, perhaps more importantly, greater amounts of distortion. This market was dominated by companies such as Marshall and later Mesa Boogie—both of which had gotten started modifying Fender amps (the Bassman and the Princeton, respectively).

Certain elements of the Blackface cosmetics were reintroduced, beginning in 1970 on a series of amplifiers designed by Ed Jahns. Amplifiers in this new line eventually included more familier types like the infamous 180W 'Super Twin' and 'Super Twin Reverb' amplifiers which featured active tone controls and a built-in distortion circuit that blended between clean and distorted sounds. However, bass amplifiers with similar black face cosmetics were actually the first amps in the reintroduced Blackface line, the bass amp versions having been designed by Jahns' and his team in 1969, and released beginning with the 1970 product line. The first release was the '400PS', a direct competitor in the marketplace with Ampeg's then brand new SVT design. At 435 watts, the '400PS' was Fender's highest power vacuum tube design to date (2025) and for marketing reasons was specifically built to out-power the SVT. The 400PS was a large venue touring rig only, and required three large folded W cabinets. The amp's size and cost severely limited its market penetration at the time. It was used on occasion during 1970-72 era by The Allman Brothers' bassist Berry Oakely, and can occasionally be spotted on stage in contemporary photographs of the band from that era. Other models in the PS line eventually incdlued a smaller version, the '300PS', as well as the '160PS', a vacuum tube based powered mixer for public address applications The PS series were unique in that they all incorporated Class AB2 circuitry and used the GE 6550A beam power tube, Fender's only designs favoring those features. Meanwhile, the Super Twin and Super Twin Reverb were class AB1 designs using six 6L6GC power tubes. All these designs were phased out of production by the mid-1970's.

These amplifiers didn't yet render obsolete the Silverface series and manufacturing of both co-existed for years. In fact, several Silverface designs were revised to used tapped primaries in the output transformer - sometimes incorrectly called "ultralinear" though it is not in fact an true Ultralinear transformer, but rather an architecture that improved power tube reliability as Fender stepped up their output power from 100 watts to 135 watts by increasing plate voltages. Also, existing Silverface Princeton Reverb and Deluxe Reverb circuits were offered in a slightly modified Blackface cosmetic package from roughly 1978 to 1982, the difference from the 1960s versions being that the model designation on the faceplate did not include the word "Amp" after the script typeface model name, as the earlier versions had.

The new Blackfaces came in varying cosmetic styles. All of them had a black control panel and traditional knobs, but they no longer featured the Blackface-style lettering to depict the model name and the traditional control panel layout was partially redesigned. Some of these amplifiers had a silver grillcloth typical to previous BF and SF series amps, but more often the amplifiers sported a black grillcloth. Some amplifiers also had an aluminum trimming running around the grille. The styling didn't become consistent until the early 1980s, at which point all these designs were already discontinued to make way for the very similar looking "II Series".

In the late 1970s and very early 1980s the "Supers" were followed by the tube-based '30', '75 (Lead)', and '140' tube amps (with reverb and overdrive features) and two solid-state 'Harvard' amps (one with reverb), which were 15W practice amplifiers. Design-wise the tube amplifiers were quite different from their predecessors, as the active tone controls and blending distortion circuit had been removed and the latter feature replaced by a crude version of the channel switching concept. A new feature addition was a crude insert-style effects loop.

== II Series and the Rivera Era ==
The II Series amplifiers were produced from 1982 until 1986, being the last Fender amps to be made at Fullerton. The specifications for these amplifiers, and leadership of the design team, came from Paul Rivera (then marketing director) and are known as Fender Rivera era amplifiers. Some amplifiers in the series used the II moniker; the Champ II, Princeton Reverb II, Deluxe Reverb II and Twin Reverb II, while others such as the Concert and Super Champ did not. Many of these amps had the normal Fender clean sound and in addition a switchable mid voiced gain channel, designed to compete with the Mesa Boogie Mark Series series amps that had gained popularity at the time. The tube amps in the series feature hand-wired eyelet board construction and are also becoming sought-after collector's items, due to the design and build quality. The range included one small tube-driven bass amp, the Bassman 20. There were also some solid-state amplifiers using the II moniker, such as the Harvard Reverb II. Other solid-state amps produced during the Rivera era included the Yale Reverb, Studio Lead, Stage Lead, London Reverb, Montreux, and a solid-state issue of the Showman. Many of these units shared the same circuitry boards in one capacity or another.

== Red Knob ==
The Red Knob amplifiers were produced from 1987 until 1993. They were made in Lake Oswego, Oregon, at the Sunn factory, a brand/company that Fender had purchased in 1985–86.

These were some of the first models produced by the newly formed Fender Musical Instrument Corporation. Aside from the bright red controls, these amplifiers have a slightly similar appearance to the older Blackface cosmetics, bearing black control panels with white lettering and the late 1970s "scripted tailless" Fender logo. Many of these models were simply refitted with black knobs and early 1970s "unscripted tailless" Fender logos in 1996 when most Fender amplifier manufacturing moved to the Ensenada factory in Mexico. This series of amplifiers all used printed circuit board construction.

Two utilized the same circuit board and wattage, the Fender Eighty-Five and the Studio 10. They contain the same 65W RMS circuit, but contain a 12" speaker and a 10" speaker, respectively. The Fender Eighty-Five was used by Steve Miller (Steve Miller Band) and Jonny Greenwood (Radiohead) on many recordings.

== The 21st century: reissues and modeling ==
In the first fifth of the 21st century, Fender turned to digital technology to expand its lineup of amplifiers. The first of these, the Cyber Twin and Cyber Deluxe, used circuits within the computer chips to replicate famous amps and effects. The preamp is tube-driven, and the power amp is solid state.

Next came the G-DEC (Guitar Digital Entertainment Center), a true modeling amp. It was released in 2007 along with a PC software package to allow it to emulate a wide array of pedals, stompboxes, and amplifiers. The G-Dec won high praise at the time but its effects, based on three-decade-old MIDI technology, were rapidly outdated. An updated G-DEC 3 was released in 2010, followed by the Mustang in 2012.

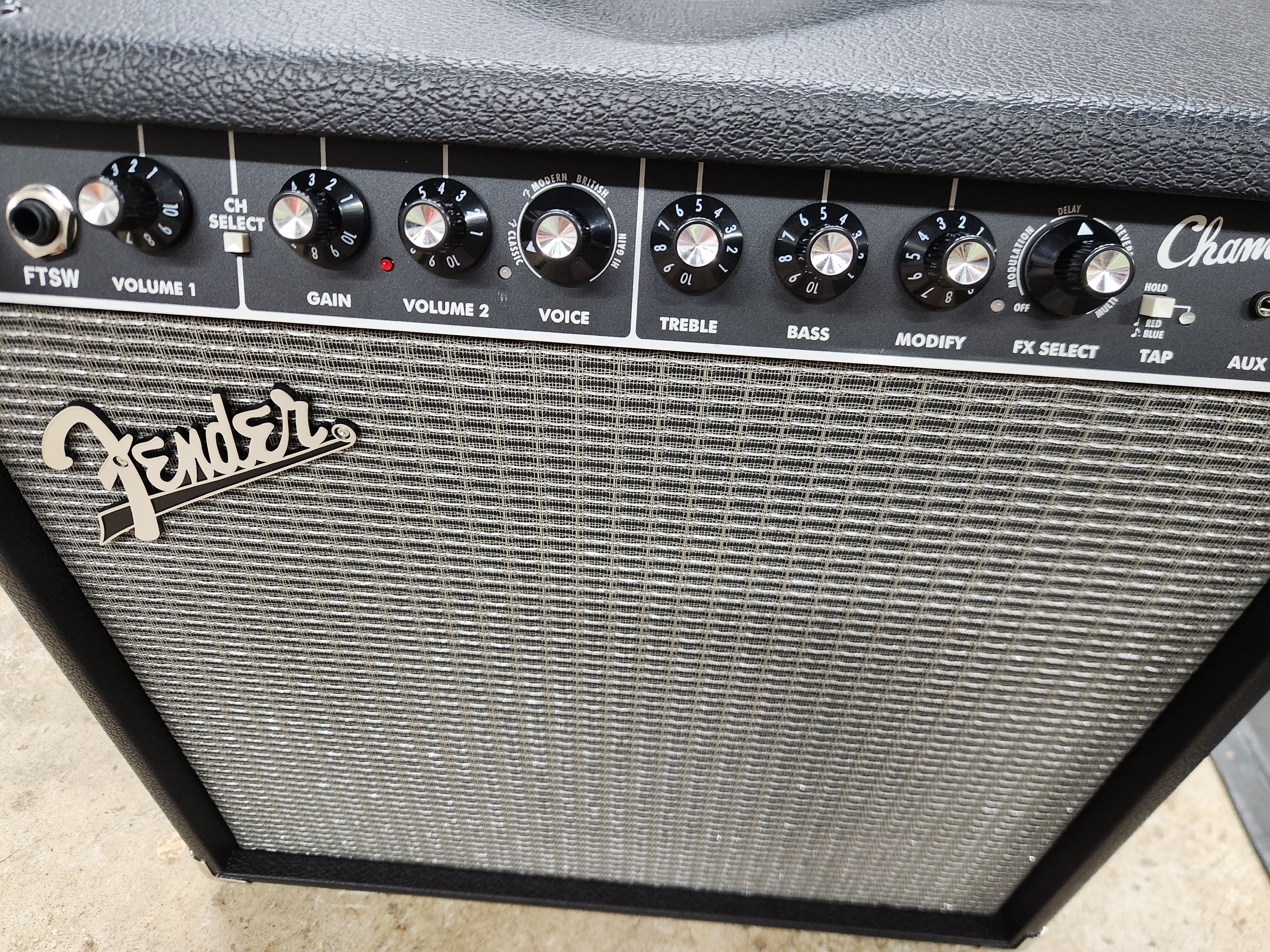
A Fender Champion II 50

The traditionally styled Champion amplifier (not to be confused with the classic and reissue Champion/Champ tube amplifiers) was released in 2014. This amp eschewed the Fuse software in favor of an on-board system, selected by knobs.

The Mustang v.2 amplifiers were released in 2015, along with a refresh of the Fuse PC app. In 2017, the Mustang GT series was launched, with Bluetooth capability and wi-fi for over-the-air software updates, with a modernized look and smartphone-enabled functionality through the new Fender Tone app.

At the same time, Fender re-released a number of classic amplifiers such as the Bassman and Bandmaster, to high praise both from the music press and the public.
