= Fender tweed =

Name for guitar amplifiers made by Fender

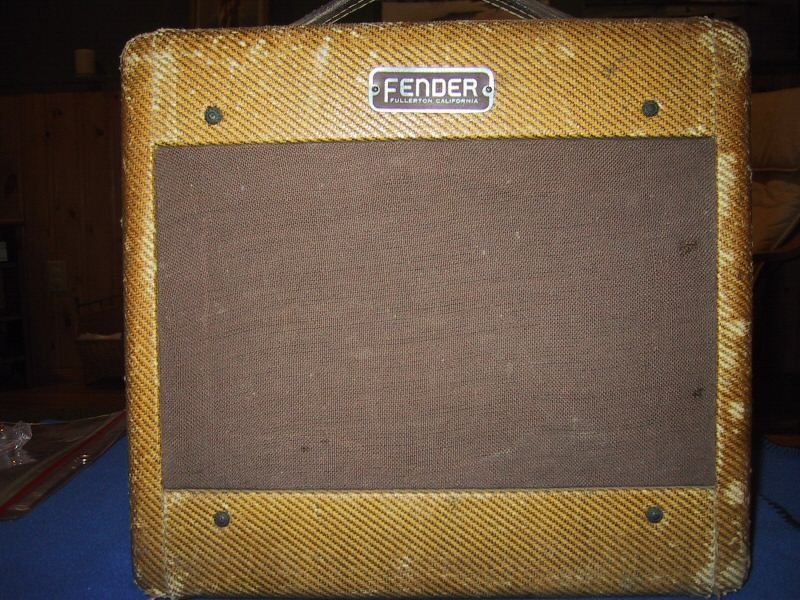
1953 Fender Champ in tweed covering, wide-panel cabinet

Fender tweed is a generic name used for the guitar amplifiers made by the American company Fender between 1948 and 1960. The amplifiers are named for the cloth covering, which consists of varnished cotton twill, incorrectly called tweed because of its feel and appearance. They are praised for their sound, their circuitry being considered "hallowed ground". Fender generally stopped using the twill covering in 1960, exceptions being the Harvard which continued to be covered in twill until 1963, and the Champ until 1964.

In 1953, Fender introduced the "wide panel" construction, where the top and bottom panels are wider than the side panels. In the later "narrow panels", introduced in 1955, all panels have approximately the same size. Later amplifiers used tolex for the covering.

Beginning in 1990, Fender began to utilize the tweed covering once again, starting with the '59 Bassman Reissue. Some later amplifier models came in the split option of tweed or black tolex covering, including the Blues Junior and Pro Junior. The Fender Blues Deluxe and Blues DeVille and their later reissues were also available in tweed, as well as the Custom Shop reissues of several of the Tweed Era amplifiers.

In 2012, Fender introduced its first "Signature series"; Eric Clapton helped design the "EC" series of three amplifiers, including the Vibro-Champ, based on the five-watt amplifier claimed to have been used for the recording of Layla and Other Assorted Love Songs.

== Tweed amplifiers ==
- Fender Bandmaster
- Fender Bassman
- Fender Blues Deluxe Reissue
- Fender Champ
- Fender Harvard
- Fender Princeton
- Fender Pro
- Fender Super
- Fender Tremolux
- Fender Tweed Deluxe
- Fender Twin
- Fender Vibrolux
