= Fender Harvard =

Vacuum tube guitar amplifier

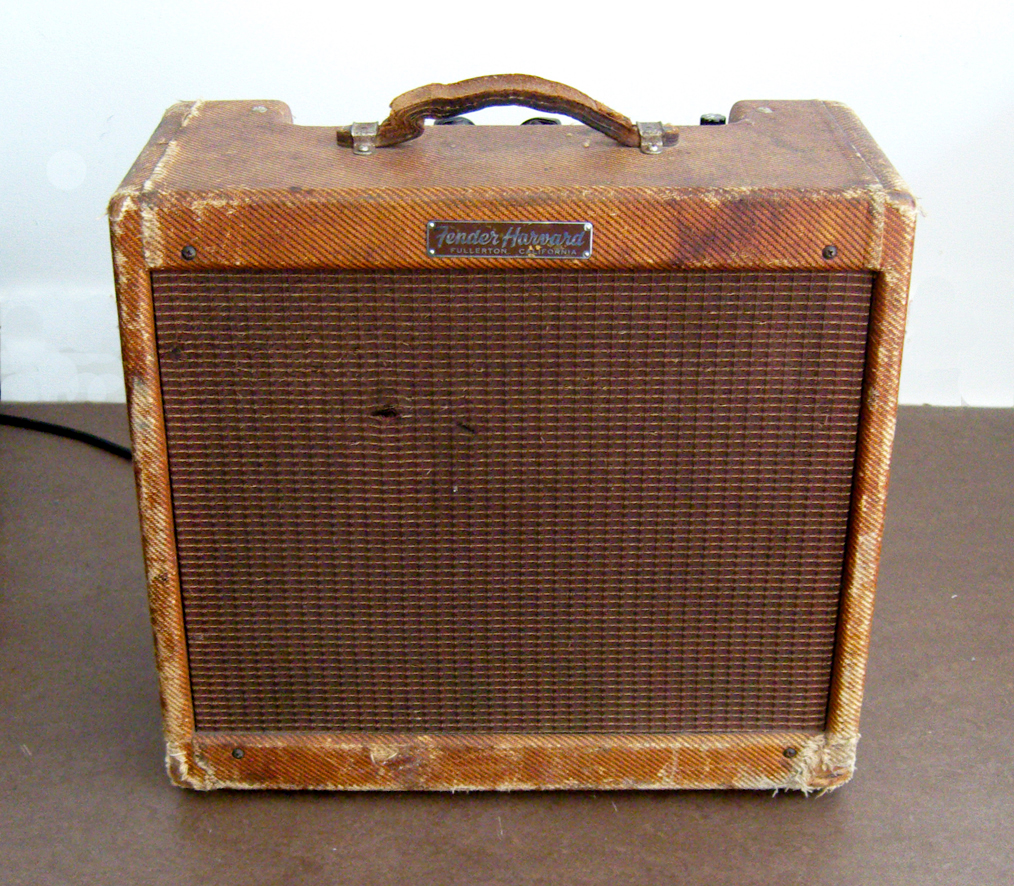
1959 Fender Harvard 5F10

The Fender Harvard is a vacuum tube (valve) guitar amplifier made by Fender from 1955 to 1963. The Harvard appeared only in a tweed covered "narrow-panel" cabinet, but in two very different circuit designs, namely 5F10 (1955–61) and 6G10 (1962–63).

The "Tweed" 5F10 model, launched in 1955, but not in time for the Fender catalog of that year, was a 10-watt amplifier utilising a 6AV6 (from 1956 a 6AT6) preamplifier tube, 12AX7 phase inverter tube, (Note: Technically, only half of the 12AX7 was the phase inverter; the other triode served as the second preamp gain stage.) a pair of 6V6GT power amplifier tubes, and one 5Y3GT rectifier tube, with a Jensen P10R 10-inch speaker. The amplifier had a very simple circuit and used only a single channel with a two-stage preamp, with just a volume and (treble-cut) tone control. It featured 3 unisolated input jacks instead of the usual two per channel on most Fender amps. This Harvard was a fixed bias amplifier, using a basic cathodyne phase inverter, but did include a selenium rectifier in the bias circuit. The 5F10 was discontinued in 1961.

The extremely rare 1962–63 6G10 Harvard used a single 12AX7, 6V6GT and 5Y3GT; it was simply a way to use up leftover 50's Princeton (5F2-A) chassis and tweed cabinets, after Fender had re-launched an all-new class AB Princeton (6G2) in a Tolex-covered "brownface" version. These Harvards sometimes even use old 5F2-A tube charts with the Princeton name scratched out; they can be identified by their Schumacher transformers (the same ones used in the new brown Princeton) and 1960s date stamps.

Unusually for Fender, the Harvard had no predecessor and, although the Harvard name was revived later by Fender, no descendants. The Harvard filled a gap between the student Champ and Princeton models and the professional Deluxe. The companion 5F11 Vibrolux was essentially identical to the Harvard, but with an added tremolo circuit driven by one side of a dual-triode 12AX7 which replaced the Harvard's single-triode 6AV6/6AT6, and was built into a Deluxe cabinet.

The 5F10 Harvard's dimensions were 16.5 × 18 × 8.75 inches (42 × 46 × 22 cm), and it weighed 20 pounds (9 kg).

The most famous user of the Fender Harvard, in conjunction with a Fender Telecaster (or Esquire) guitar, was Steve Cropper, who said that he used the amplifier for most of the classic recordings made with the Stax house band Booker T. & the M.G.'s, including Green Onions and (Sittin' On) The Dock of the Bay. Stephen Stills is also a user of the Harvard particularly for overdubbed solos, the quick compression when used with humbuckers leads to fluid lyrical single note passages. Stills is also a fan of the related 58~60 Vibrolux for tracks on record and live.
