= Fender Deluxe =

Guitar amplifier

The Fender Deluxe guitar amplifier is a range of non-reverb guitar amplifiers produced by Fender. The amplifiers were originally produced from early 1948 to 1966 and reissues are in current production. Its predecessor was the Fender Model 26 "Woodie" produced from 1946 to 1948.

== Tweed Deluxe ==
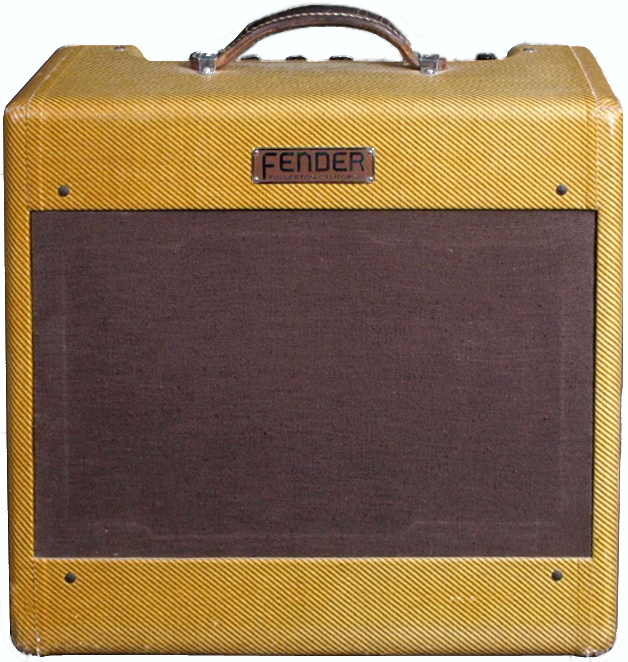
A 1953 Deluxe

The Fender Deluxe amp of the 1950s was a medium-powered unit designed to let guitarists "hold their own" in a small group. As blues, western swing, Western, and rockabilly bands began getting louder, the overdriven tone of a cranked-up Deluxe found its way onto many live and recorded performances.

The earliest version of the Deluxe was the 5A3, and is often referred to as having a TV Front appearance because the wide panels around the grill were like the television sets of the 1950s. This was true also of the smaller Fender Princeton student and studio amp introduced in 1946 and upgraded in 1948. Subsequent versions of the Deluxe were the "wide panel" cabinet design 5B3, 5C3, and 5D3, followed by the "narrow panel" cabinet 5E3. The Deluxe was the most popular of the Tweed amplifiers made by Fender.

It is relatively small in size, having one twelve inch speaker. Depending on the model it has either three or four inputs (5E3) and two channels. Each channel has a volume control. Both channels share a tone control. The inputs and controls are mounted at the top of the amplifier. It is often referred to as the "Tweed Deluxe" because of its covering—a light brown material which is actually a cotton twill that is often lacquered.

Additional top panel controls are a ground switch, power switch and mains fuse holder. The mains / power cable is hard-wired.

At the time, Leo Fender produced amplifiers with the intention of having the amplifier stay clean even at high volumes. The Tweed Deluxe is not known for producing a clean tone at high volumes, and as such, was regarded as being an intermediate amplifier. The saturated tone this amplifier produces at higher volumes is the reason why it is one of the more famous amplifiers Fender ever produced. It is part of the signature tone for many musicians, a few notable examples being Larry Carlton, Don Felder, Billy Gibbons and Neil Young.

Unusual for a Fender amplifier, the Deluxe (models 5D3 and 5E3) has a cathode biased output stage, with no negative feedback (a distinctive combination it shares with the Vox AC30 and the 18 watt Marshall model 1974). The output valves are driven by a cathodyne phase splitter. These aspects of the circuit make a key contribution to the complex, wild and ragged sound of an overdriven 5E3 Deluxe, especially in comparison to other Fender amplifiers. Most Fender push-pull amplifier designs use negative feedback, tapped from the output transformer speaker winding to enable more headroom before power stage distortion starts. They also use the more efficient negative-voltage fixed biasing on the output valves, allowing higher output power while running the output valves at a cooler temperature. (The earlier 5C3 Deluxe model did use negative feedback although it too was cathode biased.)

One of the many features of the Tweed Deluxe that some players find useful is the interaction between the two volume controls. While the two input channels each have their own volume control, signal from one input socket also finds its way onto the opposite input. Thus, adjusting the volume control for one input channel also affects the tone of the other. This gives extra tonal variations than would normally be expected.

The amplifier has a 5Y3-GT rectifier, 2 6V6-GT power tubes operating in push-pull mode, and a 12AY7 and a 12AX7 in the preamp. The output is rated at about 15 watts.

The Tweed Deluxe originally came equipped with a Jensen P12R speaker. Due to limited power handling, owners sometimes replaced it with the more powerful Jensen P12Q.

The Tweed Deluxe is such a seminal amplifier, is so desirable and (in its original form) so expensive, that there are at least 30 or 40 companies making clones or variants of it, either as kits or as completed amplifiers.

== Brown Deluxe ==
Between 1959 and 1963, Fender began redressing several of their existing amp models in a light brown material known as tolex, and moving the control faces from the top-rear of the cabinet to the front. These amps are referred to as the Brown or Brownface Fender amps. The Deluxe was one such model that made this transition in 1961. The circuit was also changed to include a tremolo effect, separate tone controls for the input channels, and a long-tail pair-type phase inverter. The preamp tube complement was changed to a trio of 12AX7 tubes, and the rectifier was changed to the more efficient GZ34 tube. The pair of 6V6GT power tubes remained the same, although the bias structure was changed from cathode to fixed biasing, bringing the output power up to around 20 watts. The circuit number was changed to 6G3, and Fender continued to build and dress the Deluxe in these circuits and cosmetics until 1963.

== Blackface Deluxe ==
Fender again made a change in their amplifier cosmetics between 1963 and 1964. The color of the tolex covering was changed to black, and the control knobs were changed from ones with pointers that indicated the level number labeled on the control face to ones that had the level numbers incorporated upon the knobs themselves. These are referred to as the Blackface amps. The Deluxe was given its new look in 1963, and again, the circuitry was altered to the number AA763, devoting a full 12AX7 to the preamp of each of the relabeled "Normal" and "Vibrato" channels, as well as to the oscillator for the tremolo effect, a 12AT7 tube as a phase inverter, and individual Treble and Bass control knobs rather than single tone controls for each channel. The output bias remained fixed, but incorporated a potentiometer to make bias adjustment simpler. The output was also bumped to 22 watts.

When Fender redressed the Deluxe in 1963, they began producing a spin-off model that included an integrated spring reverb tank, thus giving birth to the Fender Deluxe Reverb. Fender discontinued the base Deluxe model in 1966 but as of 2018, the Deluxe Reverb version was still in production.

== Reproduction ==
In 2007–2011, Fender's Custom Shop division made an authentic recreation of the 5E3 Deluxe. Handwired point-to-point and with custom made transformers based on the 1957 specification it was dubbed the Fender '57 Deluxe Amp. This is the first time Fender made a reproduction of the Tweed Deluxe.

In 2012 Fender issued an Artist Signature amplifier based on the 5E3 circuit with the addition of a tremolo effect; the Fender Eric Clapton (or EC) Tremolux.

In 2014 Fender introduced a piggyback head version of the 5E3 Deluxe to the Custom Shop lineup, dubbed the Fender '57 Deluxe Head.

In 2016 Fender issued a hand-wired Artist Signature model, "Fender Edge Deluxe", based on a customized 1957 5E3 Tweed Deluxe, part of the rig of U2-guitarist "The Edge". It featured the addition of a Celestion Blue Alnico speaker, a tighter "bass" response from the preamp, a 12AX7 in V1 instead of a 12AY7, and, an added "Standby" switch. By mid 2016 the '57 Deluxe is once again included in the custom series as the Fender '57 Custom Deluxe.

== See also ==
- Fender Hot Rod Deluxe
