= Fender Tremolux =

Guitar amplifier by Fender

The Fender Tremolux was a guitar amplifier made by Fender. It was introduced in the summer of 1955 with a rated power output of 15 watts, cathode bias, two 6V6 output tubes, and a 5Y3 tube rectifier. The Tremolux was the first Fender amp with a built in effect, tremolo.

In 1957, the rated power output of the Tremolux was increased to 18 watts when it changed to a fixed bias design and a 5U4 rectifier. In 1961, the Tremolux was changed from a 1×12 tweed-fabric covered combo amp to a piggyback amp with oxblood grillcloth, covered with cream tolex. Its rated power output was increased to 20 watts, its output tubes were a pair of 6BQ5/EL84 (the only Fender amp of that time to feature them) and they were operated at voltages in excess of their rated maximums and under fixed bias, but was soon changed to 35 watts and a pair of 6L6GC power tubes with a GZ34 rectifier (circuits 6G9-A and 6G9-B.) There were 10", 12" and 2×10" speaker cabinet configurations (the 2×10" being the majority of amps produced). In 1963, the grillcloth changed to gold colored. In 1964, the cream tolex was replaced with black tolex with silver grillecloth, and the circuit was changed to AB763, which used an optoisolator to couple the tremolo effect, replacing the earlier direct bias-modulation circuits. In 1963 and 1964, the Tremolux shared the same circuit as the Fender Vibrolux, with the Vibrolux being a one 12" combo and later the Vibrolux Reverb, a 2x10 combo as opposed to a piggyback configuration. The Tremolux was discontinued in the summer of 1966.

The early, or first Tolex-made, 6G9 Tremolux Amps were the 6BQ5/EL84 amps starting at Serial Number 100. It is unknown how many EL84 style Tremolux amps were produced, but it is one of the rarest amps that Fender made and it is suspected that production totals were likely less than 300. The EL84 Tremolux did not have professionally printed tube charts, but instead they have a typewriter-written tube chart that was copied on a blue-ink mimeograph machine.
