= Fender Deluxe Reverb =

Guitar amplifier

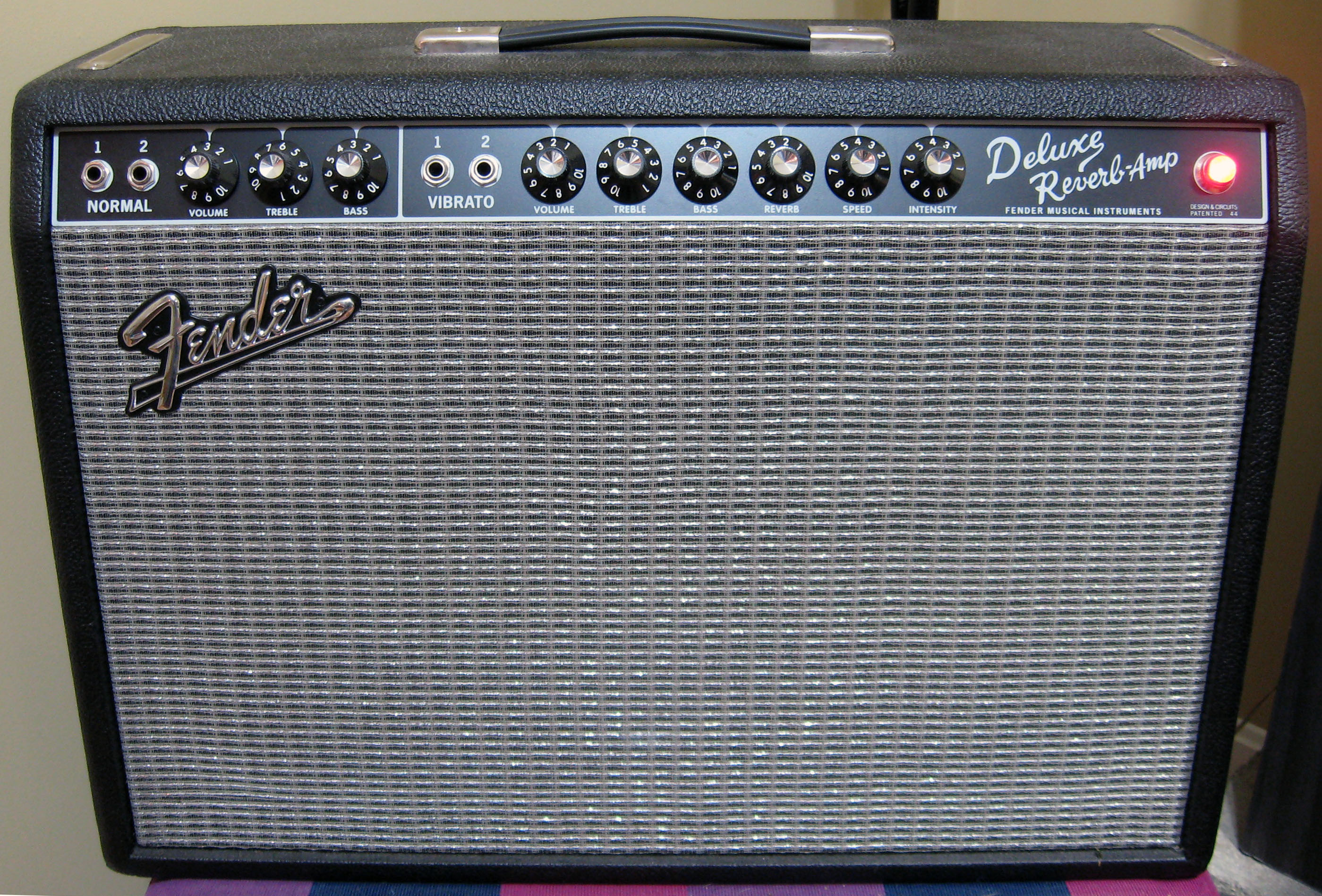
Fender Deluxe Reverb

The Fender Deluxe Reverb is a guitar amplifier made by the Fender Electric Instrument Company and its successors. It was first introduced in 1963 by incorporating an onboard spring reverb tank to the newly redesigned Fender Deluxe amplifier.

== Specifications ==
The Deluxe Reverb is a 22-watt tube amplifier (at 8 ohms), powered by a pair ("duet") of 7408/6V6GT power tubes, one GZ34/5AR4 rectifier tube, four 7025/12AX7 tubes for preamplification and tremolo oscillation, and two 6201/12AT7 tubes driving the reverb and phase inverter circuits. Throughout its production, the amplifier has most often featured a Jensen C-12Q series 12-inch loudspeaker, although Oxford 12K5, Marlboro SE, Utah and Eminence speakers have also been used. The 22-watt output was obtained by operating the 6V6 power tubes well in excess of their maximum specified operating voltage. The amplifier weighs 42 pounds and measures 9.5" x 24.5" x 17.5".

== Variations ==
The original Deluxe Reverb (circuits AA763, and later AB763) was introduced during the "black panel" era of Fender amplifiers with a black control panel and white lettering. In 1967, two years after Fender was purchased by CBS, Fender began issuing amps with a silver metallic control face and light blue lettering. This gave birth to the "silver panel" era, and the Deluxe Reverb followed suit in 1968. The circuit design remained largely unchanged through the ensuing years, and the control face was changed back to a black panel in 1980. The Deluxe Reverb was discontinued in 1982.

The Deluxe Reverb II was introduced that same year. Output on the amp was diminished to 20 watts and a solid-state rectifier was used. The tremolo circuit was removed. Gain, master volume, and presence controls were added, and the two channels were made switchable as opposed to the individual inputs on the Deluxe Reverb. The Deluxe Reverb II was effectively a completely different amplifier, and it was discontinued in 1986. This was the so-called "Rivera-era".

In 1993, Fender released the '65 Deluxe Reverb reissue, with the original cosmetics and circuitry, but wired on a printed circuit board rather than hand-wired. The reissue is still currently in production.

In the summer of 2013, Fender produced a limited run of the Deluxe Reverb reissue in the form of an amplifier head. This had never been done in the past, as Fender had only built the Deluxe and its derivatives as combo amps (an amp with built-in speaker). The limited run only saw a very small number produced, however, it was announced in early 2014 that Fender was adding the Deluxe Reverb Head to its permanent lineup of Vintage Reissue series amplifiers. Also in 2013, Fender introduced a redressed version of the reissue with silverface cosmetics and slightly altered circuitry, dubbed the '68 Custom Deluxe Reverb.

== See also ==
- Fender Hot Rod Deluxe
