= Fender Hot Rod Deluxe =

Guitar amplifier

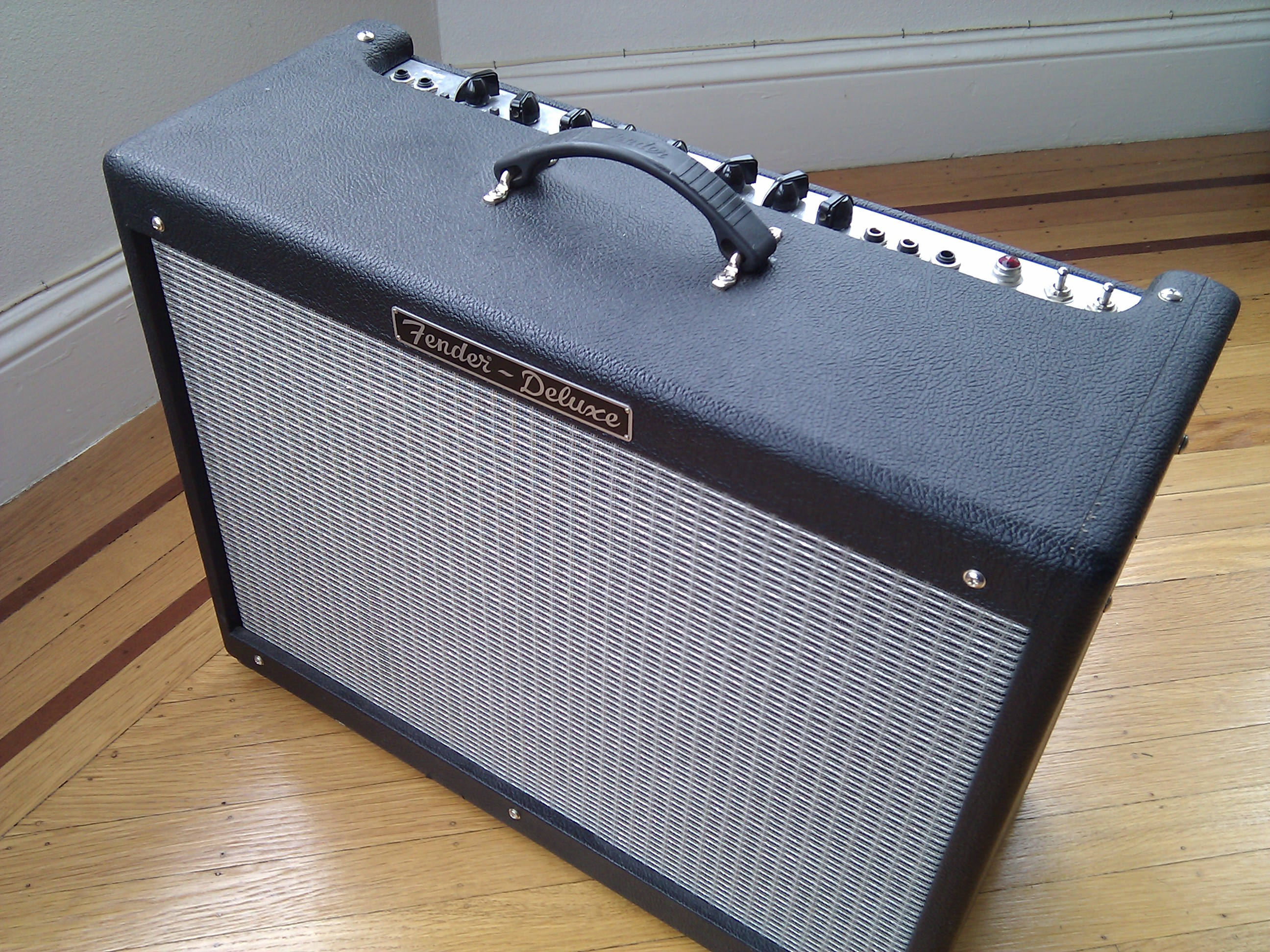
Fender Hot Rod Deluxe front view

The Fender Hot Rod Deluxe is a guitar amplifier manufactured and sold by the Fender Musical Instruments Corporation. It was introduced in 1996 as part of the "Hot Rod" line of guitar amplifiers and has been in continuous production since. The Hot Rod Deluxe is a modified version of the Fender Blues Deluxe from the earlier Blues line of amplifiers, and has a higher level of gain in its preamplification signal. This model, along with the Hot Rod Deville, were originally designated as F.A.T. ('Fender American Tube') amplifiers but this moniker was dropped in 2002 when production of this series of amps was moved from Corona, CA to Fender's Baja-Ensenada, Mexico manufacturing facility.

== Specifications ==
The Hot Rod Deluxe is an all tube combo amp rated at 40 watts. It utilizes a single 12-inch Celestion A-Type Speaker. The Hot Rod Deluxe is a mono-channel amplifier featuring 3 switchable gain levels: "Clean", "Drive", and "More Drive" selectable on either the control panel or footswitch (if plugged in). Other features include a Bass, Middle, and Treble EQ, Master Volume, Presence, Normal/Bright, and spring reverb (solid state for both the driver and the recovery circuits). Footswitch and External Speaker jacks are also built in.

== Electronics and construction ==
As an all-tube (pre-amp and power sections) combo guitar amplifier, the Hot Rod Deluxe features a pair of 6L6GC beam tetrodes for the power section and two 12AX7 dual triodes for the preamp section. One additional 12AX7 tube is utilized for the phase inverter of the power section. However, the rectifier, reverb driver and recovery, and effects loop circuits are solid state. The power section uses a fixed bias biasing scheme with an adjustable bias potentiometer installed from the factory. The factory bias is 60 mA total for both 6L6s.

The physical appearance of the Hot Rod series is based on the mid-to-late 1950s narrow panel tweed amplifiers with accouterments such as a top mounted, chrome plated chassis and black "chicken head" pointer knobs, but with textured black tolex found on Fender amps from the 1960s onward rather than the tweed covering.

Fender Hot Rod Deluxe interior view

Unlike vintage Fender tube amplifiers, the Hot Rod Deluxe uses a Printed Circuit Board (PCB) construction rather than Point-to-Point (PTP) construction. Internally, there are two sets of circuit boards. The main circuit board contains the majority of the electronic elements and provides the base onto which the potentiometers for the various controls, and the input and output jacks, are mounted. A secondary board provides the base onto which the tube sockets are mounted (although the pair of power tube sockets are mounted directly on the chassis with long leads connecting those to the secondary board).

== Stock and other versions ==
At various times, Fender has released special versions or Limited Editions of this amplifier. The stock version of the Hot Rod Deluxe features a 7-Ply 3/4" Birch/Maple Plywood cabinet upholstered in black tolex with silver sparkle speaker grille cloth.

Fender has also updated the Hot Rod Deluxe periodically. From 1996–2010, the stock speaker is an Eminence Legend 1258 75 Watt (special design) speaker. In 2010 the updated version, (dubbed the Hot Rod Deluxe III) was equipped with a Celestion G12P-80 speaker. In 2018 it was updated again with a Celestion A-Type speaker, pine cabinet, smoother-sounding spring reverb and modified preamp circuitry.

=== Limited editions ===
From 2003 to 2004 Fender released two limited edition models in polished maple hardwood (no tolex covering). One of these had a classic three-color sunburst finish; the other was a stained natural finish (both with Jensen speakers).

From late 2006 to March 2007, Fender offered the Hot Rod Deluxe White Lightning Limited Edition. Notable features include white tolex with white control knobs, dark black/silver grille cloth, white pilot light (instead of the stock red), and a 12 inch Celestion G12 Century Vintage 8-ohm, 60-watt Speaker.

Starting in early 2008, Fender offered the Hot Rod Deluxe in "Texas Red" Limited Edition, main differences being a 12 inch Celestion G12 Century Vintage 8-ohm, 60-watt speaker much like the White Lightning version. It also includes ivory chicken knobs.

Other limited editions have included:

- Emerald Green (V30, ivory knob, British emerald, grey grill)
- Orange Racing Stripe
- Wine Red
- Surf Green
- Red Nova
- Western tooled tolex
- Chocolate Brown
- Bluesman blue tolex
- Western Noir
- Python Snakeskin
- George Benson Signature

Fender has also released Hot Rod Deluxes adorned in blonde tolex (with wheat or ox-blood grill) or tweed cloth (with ox-blood grill). Alternate installed speakers have also included the Celestion A-Type, Jensen P12N alnico or Jensen C12N ceramic speaker reissues.

=== Hot Rod Deluxe III ===
In 2010, Fender released an update to the Hot Rod Deluxe with the following changes:

Cosmetic upgrades

- Easier-reading black control panel
- New badge

Electronic upgrades

- Graduated volume and treble pot tapers
- "Tighter" overdrive

Other upgrades

- Celestion G12P-80 speaker
- New low-profile pedalboard friendly footswitch

=== Hot Rod Deluxe IV ===
In 2018, Fender released the Hot Rod Deluxe IV. The newer model uses a pine cabinet, as opposed to MDF used in previous iterations. The Hot Rod Deluxe IV also has a Celestion A-Type speaker (A for American sound)

== See also ==
- Fender Hot Rod DeVille
- Peavey Delta Blues 210
