= Fender Super =

Guitar amplifier

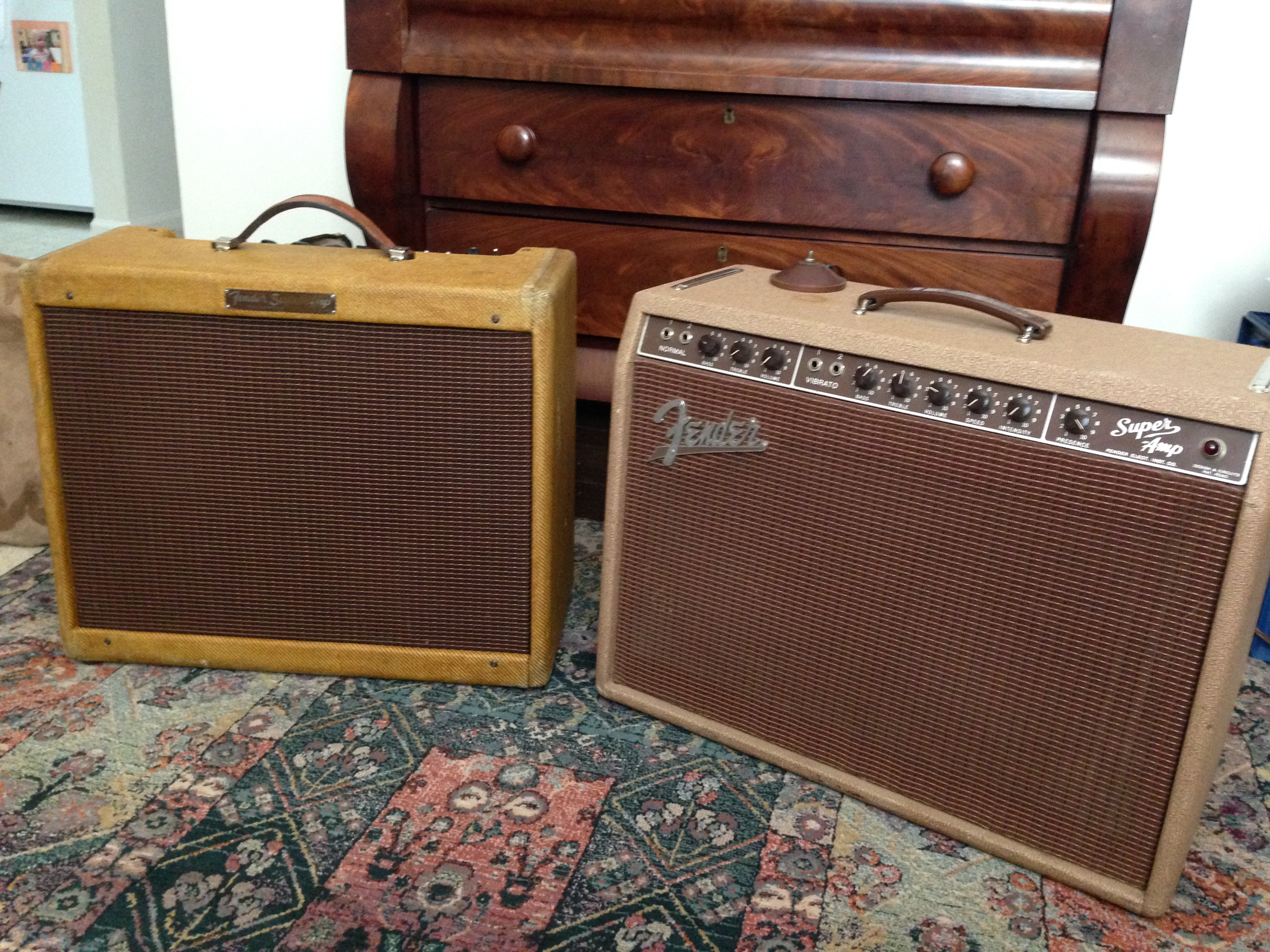
Left: 1958 Fender Super Amp model 5F4; Right: 1960 Fender Super Amp model 5G4

The Fender Super was a guitar amplifier made by Fender between 1947 and 1963 and, as the Super Reverb, until 1981.

== History ==
The Super evolved from the so-called Dual Professional, "often cited as the world's first twin-speaker amplifier," which was introduced in 1947. The Dual Professional had two slightly angled 10" Jensen speakers, and had two 6L6 tubes producing 18 watts. It was renamed the Super in the fall of 1947.

The amplifier's circuit was changed in 1955 (until then it was identical to the Fender Pro, except for the speaker configuration) when the 6L6 tubes were exchanged for 6V6 tubes; the 1958 5F4 model was again equipped with 6L6 tubes, so its circuitry was again almost identical to that of the Pro (5E5-A model) and the Bandmaster (5E7 model).

The 5F4 model had Presence, Bass, and Treble controls, and separate Volume controls for the microphone and instrument inputs. It used 12AY7 pre-amplifier tubes for "more clarity and headroom" than a 12AX7 would. A fixed-bias output stage and split-phase inverters helped the Super overdrive more quickly than the Fender Bassman and produce a sound that, according to Vintage Guitar's Dave Hunter, "in the estimation of many a vintage-amp fan, is among the sweetest and most delectable of any amp ever made."

In 1960, the Super Amp was redesigned along with the remainder of the Professional Series of Fender amplifiers. Accordingly, the 5G4 Super Amp was clad in light brown tolex and outfitted with a forward facing control panel. The chassis contained a larger circuit with 5 preamp tubes to support a new onboard vibrato circuit. The Super, however, was the only one of these updated Professional amps to retain its tube rectifier, giving it a unique sound more akin to the preceding tweed 5F4 design. By the end of 1960, the vibrato circuit was beefed up again resulting in the 6 preamp tube model 6G4 followed shortly after by the 6G4-A.

This latter model (6G4-A) is the most common design lasting from mid 1961 to 1963 until the Super-Reverb Amp was debuted. The 6G4-A however typically sports standard brown tolex with wheat colored grill cloth and delivers approximately 40 watts of power. During this time, the 2-10" speakers were either Jensen AlNiCo or Oxford AlNiCo models. The output transformer was an initial weak point in the design as they tended to short out and fail under the increased power after 1958 when the Super regained its 40 watts of muscle thanks to the return to 6L6/5881 power tubes. As a result, Fender began using Woodward-Schumacher 4-ohm transformers (stamped 125A6A). These transformers had thicker gauge wires than the previous Triad version (stamped 45216) and handled the higher power with less stress.

== See also ==
- Fender Super Reverb
