= Sithu Aye =

Scottish guitarist

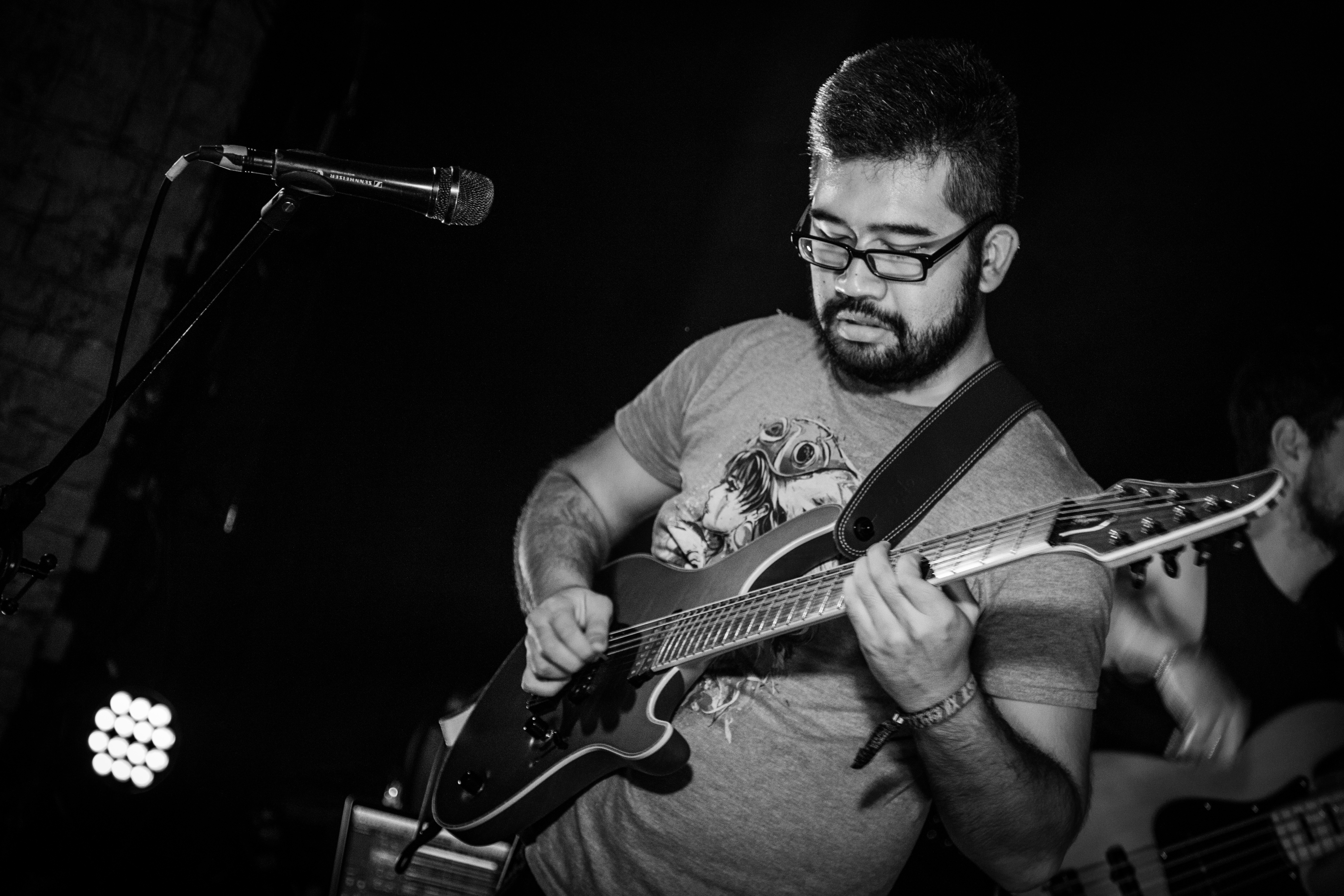
- Sithu Aye in 2016

Background information
- Born: Sithu Maung Maung Aye; 26 June 1990 (age 36)
- Genres: Instrumental, progressive metal, djent
- Instruments: Guitar, bass
- Years active: 2011-present
- Website: www.sithuaye.scot

Sithu Aye (Burmese: စည်သူမောင်မောင်အေး; born 26 June 1990) is a Scottish-Burmese guitarist, musician, and producer based in Scotland. He began his career with the release of his first album, Cassini, in 2011, which was self-recorded and independently released. He has released five full-length albums and seven EPs. His latest album, 10 Years: Remixes and Reimaginings, was released 29 November 2021. He has toured in Japan with Reflections and Protest The Hero, the UK and Europe with Skyharbor, the UK with Galactic Empire and the US and Canada with Haken.

== Career ==
Sithu Aye started playing guitar at age 12. He wrote and recorded his first album Cassini using software amp modellers and his laptop in his university's dormitory. Subsequently, many of his following releases were written and recorded while studying Physics at University of St Andrews, such as Invent the Universe, Isles EP and 26. Sithu wrote and produced his EP 26 over the course of four days to release it on 26 June 2013, which marked his 23rd birthday as well as the day he graduated with a Master's degree in Physics.

After his graduation Sithu Aye worked as a Technology Consulting Analyst for Deloitte until 2016. In this time period he wrote and recorded Pulse, Senpai EP and Set Course for Andromeda. With the release of the latter he announced quitting his job and pursuing a full-time career as a musician. A month after quitting his job, he went on a Japan tour with Protest the Hero.

During 2018, he took a break from touring to write his album Homebound, which was released on 17 December of the same year and was made available at the start of December to his supporters on patreon. In 2019 he headlined a tour in the UK in support of his album Homebound and toured Europe supporting Intervals. He also worked on a follow-up to his Senpai EP series, which he announced to be more of a full-length album this time and accompanied by a Visual Novel themed digital story booklet.

On 12 December 2020, Sithu Aye released the first single Time to Decide! on his YouTube channel, where he also announced his new album Senpai III to be released on 8 January 2021 on all platforms except patreon, where it was released immediately for all supporters of a certain tier. With 10 songs Senpai III is the first full-length album of the Senpai series and is also intended to be the last. The album also stands out from his other releases by the music itself not being the singular focus, since it contains a digital novella, telling a continuous story with each chapter being accompanied by the correspondingly titled song.

During 2021, Sithu Aye announced he was starting his work on a new EP which was supposed to be taking a different approach than his usual Progressive Metal style and instead aiming for the genre of Jazz fusion and Funk. In the same year, 29 November 2021, Aye released 10 Years: Remixes and Reimaginings, which contains 10 songs from across various previous releases and which have been rerecorded and rearranged in new and different styles of music. On 15 October 2022, he released Re:Invent the Universe (10th Anniversary Remaster), which is a remix and remaster of his 2012 album Invent the Universe. After having released a full song preview in 2023 exclusive to Patreon subscribers, in 2024 he eventually declared the discontinuation of his work on the Jazz fusion EP in favor of a different EP, to feature his signature Progressive Metal sound. Following this, on 24 March 2024 Aye announced the title, cover artwork and release date of the then upcoming EP Kindness and published its first single Run it Down. Zero Sum Groove was released as the second single on 21 April 2024 alongside a music video filmed and directed by his brother Kaung-Myat Aye. On 11 May 2024 Kindness was released, which marks Sithu Aye's first release featuring the guitars being recorded using real amplifiers instead of amp modellers.

== Style ==
Sithu Aye's music can be described as instrumental progressive metal that is focused on lead guitar, influenced by prominent artists of the early djent scene, such as Periphery and Animals as Leaders. He describes his style as 'happy progressive metal'. His three Senpai EPs are also influenced by Japanese anime music and artwork.

== Gear ==
Sithu is a Mayones artist, using their Regius, Setius and Duvell guitar models. He also is a D'Addario artist, using their NYXL strings and Dunlop artist, having used Jazz III XL guitar picks and is currently using Dunlop Flow picks. He is also known for using Fractal Axe FX II.

Since 2021, he is in possession of a Fender Blues Junior guitar amplifier, which he used together with a Shure SM57 microphone to record the guitar tracks on his 2024 EP Kindness.

== Discography ==
=== Albums ===
- Cassini (2011)
- Invent the Universe (2012)
- Set Course for Andromeda (2016)
- Homebound (2018)
- Senpai III (2021)
- 10 Years: Remixes and Reimagines (2021)

=== EPs ===
- Isles EP (2012)
- 26 (2013)
- I (2013) (split with Plini)
- Pulse (2014)
- Senpai EP「先輩EP」(2015)
- Senpai EP II: The Noticing (2017)
- Kindness EP (2024)

=== Singles ===
- "Oceania" (2014)
- "Senpai, Please Notice Me!" (2015)
- "Set Course for Andromeda!!!" (2016)
- "Spiral" (2016)
- "Transient Transistors" (2016)
- "And Here's to Many More" (2016)
- "Primary Ignition" (2018)
- "Runaway Reaction" (2018)
- "Time to Decide!" (2020)
- "Run it Down" (2024)
- "Zero Sum Groove" (2024)

== Awards ==
Sithu was nominated for a Scottish Alternative Music Award in the best metal category on 20 September 2017.
