= Fender Bassman =

Bass amplifier series

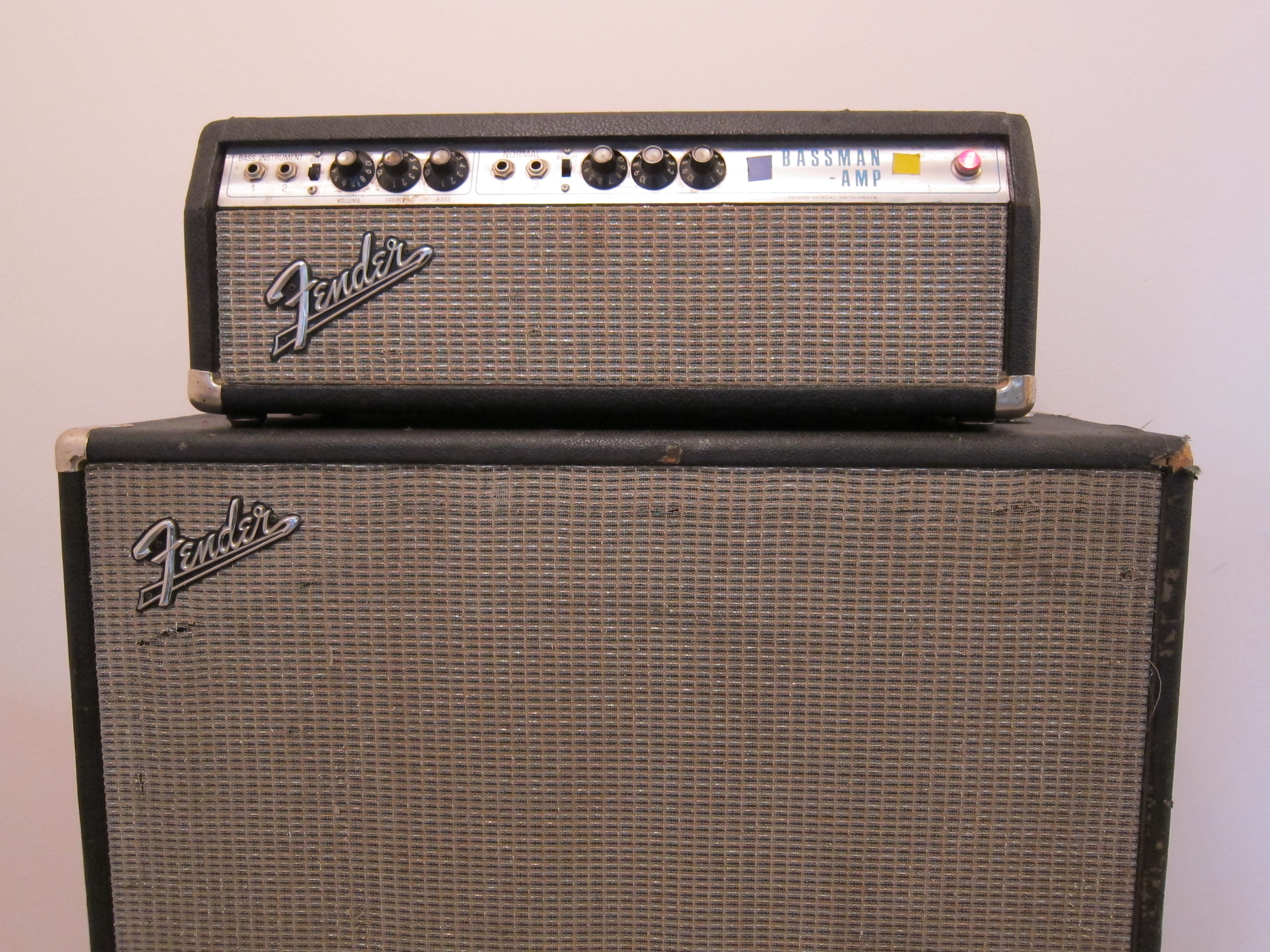
Fender Silverface Bassman amp AB165 amplifier, with a 2×15" speaker cabinet

The Fender Bassman is a series of instrument amplifiers produced by Fender. Released in 1952, the Bassman was the industry's first dedicated bass amplifier, as Fender's existing guitar amps proved inadequate for handling the low frequencies of the Precision Bass, which Fender had debuted the previous year. Multiple design changes occurred through the 1950s, culminating in the 4×10 combo "5F6A" model, which later became the Bassman's most well-known iteration. Despite its initial purpose as a bass amp, the Bassman's increased power attracted many early rock and roll guitarists, such as Buddy Holly, and Fender soon stopped marketing it as a bass amp.

In 1961, Fender "reconfigured" the Bassman into a much different amp than what had come before, replacing the characteristic tweed coverings of previous models with near-white tolex and now producing separate heads and cabinets. These early 1960s "blonde" models increased the Bassman's popularity among guitarists, with the Beatles extensively using them, as did Pete Townshend on early records with the Who. Later "blackface" and "silverface" editions followed, continuing to evolve the Bassman's circuit and styling into the early 1970s when the model began to decline in popularity. Following the success of boutique brands building amps based on late-1950s tweed models, Fender began releasing Bassman reissues in the 1990s.

Besides being a popular and important amplifier in its own right, the Bassman is also notable for its influence on other brands, with Marshall famously basing its own first amp model, the JTM45, on a 5F6A Bassman.

== History ==
=== Tweed models ===
==== The 5B6 Bassman ====
In 1951, Fender released its first solidbody electric bass guitar, the Precision Bass. At the time, Fender did not offer a dedicated amplifier for it, believing existing models like the Fender Pro with its single 15" speaker would prove adequate for handling the Precision Bass's lower frequencies. This did not prove to be the case, however, and the brand began developing a new, bass guitar-oriented amp for release in 1952. This model—named the "Bassman" after initially appearing in Fender's product catalog as simply "Amplifier"—shared the same 15" speaker combo format and tweed-covered, "TV-front" styling of the Pro, but differed in much of its internals. While it employed an octal 6SC7 preamp tube like the Pro, it used a 6SL7 phase inverter with 6L6 output tubes and a 5U4 rectifier tube. It was a single-channel amplifier, with controls for only volume and tone. These and a pair of inputs were mounted on an upper panel, while the back of the amp was enclosed by a panel with two round ports to enable better bass response from its 15" Jensen speaker.

Fender switched the Bassman to a "wide-panel" design in 1953 and began using compact nine-pin preamp tubes, such as a 12AY7 in the first gain stages and a 12AX7 phase inverter. Fender marketed this revised amp, dubbed model 5B6, as "not a hashed-over guitar amplifier, but an instrument that has been designed for the reproduction of bass and bass only." Despite these claims, the Bassman continued to experience problems with handling lower frequencies at high volumes due to the size of the speaker cone and underpowered voice coil. Fender's solution—dividing the load between multiple smaller speakers—would be employed in the Bassman's next iteration.

==== The 5D6 Bassman with dual rectifiers ====
During November 1954, Fender introduced the newly designed 5D6 Bassman amplifier offering four 10" speakers and was designed utilizing two rectifier tubes. The 5D6 was a major departure from the earlier 5B6 Fender Bassman model. Designed by Freddie Tavares, longtime R&D man at Fender, the new circuit included two rectifier tubes and became known as the Dual Rectifier Bassman. Instead of the single 15" speaker, four 10" Jensen Alnico P10R speakers were used. The circuit had two innovations: a fixed bias for the power tubes, which increased power in comparison to the earlier cathode bias design, and a cathodyne phase inverter, using half of the 12AX7 tube and allowing a third gain stage on the other half.

The first 4x10 Bassman amplifiers started with a batch of prototypes in November and December 1954, model 5D6. No schematic for the 5D6 circuit has ever been found, but Ken Fox and Frank Roy have created a few from originals, and copies are freely available online. Only 11 of these early 5D6 Bassman examples are known to have survived. The lowest serial number known to still exist is 0013 (Frank Roy), 0035 (Albert Talley), 0075 (Jim Cornett), 0077 (Perry Tate), 0089 (Mark Grandfield), 0701, 0745 (Walter Horton), 0769 (Hayes Kolb), 0780 (sold on eBay Nov 2006), 0783, and 0785 (Hayes Kolb) are among those still known to exist.

==== Narrow panel models, 1954 to 1960 ====
Fender began making other models with tweed covering, a similar open backed cabinet with a rectangular grill cloth and a narrow (just over an inch wide) tweed covered panel at the top and bottom. Produced from 1954 until 1960, these models are called the "narrow panel" tweed amps .

Fender introduced the model 5D6 "DK" in November 1954, which with a few circuit updates became the 5D6-A. It was then followed by the 5E6 during early 1955. The 5E6-A revision model was introduced later that year and included some evolutionary improvements. Demand for the tweed Bassman amp grew, so Fender increased production. By the middle of 1957 more than 1,500 examples of the 5E6 series had been sold.

In July 1957, Fender introduced the model 5F6 Bassman. This model also had four Jensen P10R speakers, but the power supply was redesigned around a single 83 mercury vapor rectifier tube, and a new preamp circuit was introduced that included a three-knob tone stack, with separate controls for treble, midrange and bass. The power amp included a "long tailed pair" phase inverter, an innovation that noticeably increased the "headroom" or clean power output capability of the amplifier. Similar preamp changes were also incorporated in the 5F8 Twin Amp at about the same time, but not on other large-size Fender amps.

===== 5F6-A =====
During 1958, Fender introduced the model 5F6-A Bassman model. This final 1950s Tweed Bassman model product line included a change from the 83 mercury vapor rectifier tube to the GZ34 rectifier tube, as well as a modification within the Presence control circuit. During early 1960, Fender began producing the 5F6-A Bassman with Jensen P10Q speakers. The P10Q speakers handle more power and produce better "clean" tones than the earlier P10R speakers. The P10R speakers were shipped within all Fender Bassman amps from late 1954 until early 1960. Many professional music industry analysts have proclaimed the 1950s Fender 4×10 Bassman amps as the greatest guitar amp ever. The first 1954 Fender Tweed 5D6 4×10 circuit generated further Tweed Bassman amplifier development through 1960. Several Bassman models were progressively influenced by the 5D6 through the last Fender Tweed 5F6-A Bassman's circuit design.

The 5F6-A Bassman's design is greatly influential in terms of guitar amplification, as the schematic was directly copied by other manufacturers. Marshall Amplification utilized the circuit unmodified in their JTM45 amplifier during the early 1960s. The early version of Traynor YBA-1 is also directly copied from 5F6-A circuits, with later versions modified.

In 1990, Fender began reissuing the 5F6-A Bassman as a guitar amp. The first series of the reissue were made at the Corona, California facility, and came equipped with four Eminence-made 10" blue frame AlNiCo speakers, and a solid-state rectifier unit. Later on, production was moved to Ensenada, Baja California, and the model name was altered to "59 Bassman LTD". The LTD came equipped with the original 5AR4 rectifier tube, and four Jensen P10R reissue alnico speakers, which was period correct for the original amp.

=== Reconfiguration ===
==== Piggyback model ====
In late 1960, Fender introduced a completely redesigned model 6G6 Bassman Amp, using the piggy-back design, in which the amplifier chassis is housed in a small enclosure and metal hardware clip bars are used to secure the amplifier to the speaker cabinet. This mechanism allows for tilting, as Fender's combo amplifiers feature, using metal legs on the side of the speaker cabinet. The amplifier’s output connects to the speakers through a wired connection, referred to as a speaker cable.

The early models were called "Brownface" because of the dark brown color used on the control panel. The 6G6 model was covered in rough Blonde colored Tolex material with Oxblood colored grill cloth. It had a single GZ34 rectifier, two 5881/6L6GC power tubes and four 12AX7 preamp tubes. The output was 50 watts at 8 ohms into a single 12 inch speaker, with a "Tone Ring" baffle in the speaker cabinet. In early 1961, model 6G6-A was introduced with a solid state rectifier replacing the GZ34, and two 12" speakers with a conventional baffle in a slightly larger cabinet (wired in parallel) with a 4-ohm output. In 1962, model 6G6-B was introduced, which incorporated circuit changes but used the same speaker configuration. In 1963 smooth Blonde Tolex covering was used instead of the early rough texture cover, and a light tan grill cloth. In late 1963, Fender changed the cosmetics to what is commonly known as the "blackface" scheme. This amp still had the presence knob and same circuit (designated 6G6-B) as the smooth Blonde Tolex Bassman, but the faceplace was now black, the Tolex was black, and the grillcloth had moved to a silver cloth with black thread. The logo had also transitioned from the flat cast tin Fender with the brown paint in the tail, to a plastic logo with faux chrome and more 3-D shape.

In 1964 Fender introduced the AA864 circuit, and changed the appearance to the "Blackface" design, with black tolex covering and a black painted control panel. Fender was sold to CBS in 1965, and the AA165 circuit was briefly introduced, before being replaced by the AB165 circuit. The "Blackface" design continued until the "Silverface" model was introduced in mid 1967. Early "Drip-Edge" Silverface Bassmans made in mid 1967 used the same AB165 circuitry as the previous Blackface versions. The Brownface, Blackface, and Silverface "piggyback head" (except the Bassman 10 and 20, which were also combo amplifiers) versions of the 1960s, 1970s, and early 1980s generally followed a trend toward cleaner sound and more headroom.

=== Later models ===
==== Solid-state Fender Bassman ====
In 2000, Fender introduced a range of solid-state Fender Bassman combos, the Bassman 25, 60, and 200. These were joined by the Bassman 100 combo and the tube-powered Bassman 300 head in 2002. In 2005 all the solid-state combos were replaced with much smaller and lighter, and more powerful models, the Bassman 100, 150, and 250. The Bassman 250 was available with two speaker combinations or as a head only. These solid-state Bassman amps were discontinued in 2010, however the tube Bassman 300 continued on until 2013.

==== Hybrid Bassman TV ====
In 2009, Fender introduced the hybrid Fender Bassman TV series with a tube pre-amp and solid-state power amp. These were available as the Ten (150W 10" combo), Twelve (150W 12" combo), Fifteen (350W 15" combo), and the Duo Ten (350W 2 × 10" combo).

== Other models ==
- Super Bassman (1969–1971) – one speaker cabinet
- Super Bassman II (1969–1972) – two speaker cabinets
- Bassman 10 (1972–1982) – Silverface combo – four 10" speakers, 50 Watts/RMS (models produced after 1977 came with a three-band EQ on the Bass channel and 75 Watts/RMS with ultra-linear output section).
- Bassman 50 (1972–1977) – Silverface piggyback head – two 15" speakers, 50 Watts/RMS – Same specs as the original silverface Bassman heads produced between 1968 and 1972, except for the addition of a tailless amp decal and an AC568 circuit.
- Bassman 100 (1972–1977) – Silverface piggyback head – four 12" speakers, 100 Watts/RMS.
- Bassman 135 (1978–1983) – Silverface piggyback head – Same as the Bassman 100, with 135 Watts/RMS, ultra-linear output section and a three band EQ on the Bass channel.
- Bassman 70 (1977–1983) – Silverface piggyback head – Same as the Bassman 50, with 70 Watts/RMS, ultra-linear output section and a master volume control.
- Bassman 20 (1982–1983) – Blackface combo – one 15" speaker
- '59 Bassman (1990–2003) – 5F6-A reissue
- '59 Bassman LTD (Vintage Reissue Series) (2004–present) – 5F6-A reissue
- Bassman 25 (2000–2005) – one 10" speaker, 25 Watts/RMS solid state.
- Bassman 60 (2000–2005) – one 12" speaker, one horn, 60 Watts/RMS solid state.
- Bassman 200 (2000–2005) – one 15" speaker, one compression driver, 200 Watts/RMS solid state.
- Bassman 100 (2002–2005) – one 15" speaker, one piezo horn, 100 Watts/RMS solid-state.
- Bassman 100 (2005–2010) – one 10" speaker, one piezo horn, 100 Watts/RMS solid-state.
- Bassman 150 (2005–2010) – one 12" speaker, one piezo horn, 150 Watts/RMS solid-state.
- Bassman 250 (2005–2010) – one 15" speaker, or two 10" speakers, or head only, 250Watts/RMS solid state.
- Bassman 300 (2002–2013) – head only, 300W tube, for use with Bassman 410 or 215 cabinets.
- Bassman 400 (200?–) – two 10" and one horn, or head only(400H), 350 Watts/RMS at 4 Ohms, solid state.
- Bassman 1200 (200?–) – head only, 1200 Watts at 2 Ohms, 800 Watts at 4 Ohms, solid state.

== See also ==
- Dumble Overdrive Special, an amplifier based on a modified Fender Bassman

== Bibliography ==
- Kelly, Martin; Foster, Terry; Kelly, Paul (2010). Fender: The Golden Age 1946–1970. London & New York: Cassell. ISBN 978-1-84403-666-0.
- Wheeler, Tom (2007). The Soul of Tone. Milwaukee: Hal Leonard. ISBN 978-0-634-05613-0.
