= Fender Champ =

Guitar amplifier

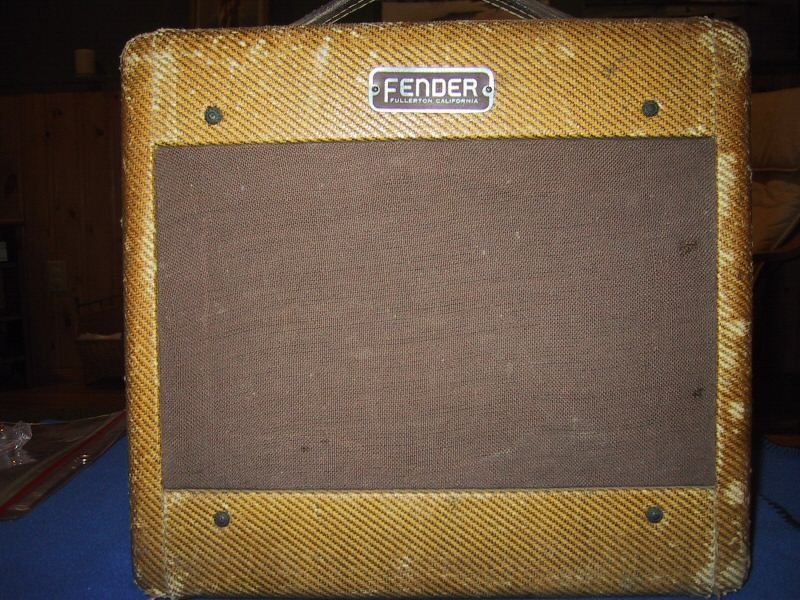
1953 Fender Champ in tweed covering

The Fender Champ was a guitar amplifier made by Fender. It was introduced in 1948 and discontinued in 1982. An updated version was introduced in 2006 as part of the "Vintage Modified" line.

The Champ had the lowest power output and the simplest circuit of all Fender tube amps. The Champ had only one power tube, and the power stage circuit is, typically, single-ended and class A. Five watts and the simple toneful circuit allowed the Champ to be used easily and often in recording studios.

== Champion 800/600 ==
First introduced in 1948, it sported the name "Champion 800" (with 8" speaker), changing a year later to "Champion 600" (6" speaker) with circuit designation 5B1. It was rated at about 3 watts, featuring a "T.V. Front" style cabinet; the 800 was covered in greenish fabric while the 600 featured two-tone blonde and brown vinyl covering. This style lasted until 1953, when Fender's cabinet style changed to the "Wide Panel" design with a tweed cloth covering. Fender also renamed the circuit the "5C1", "5" standing for the decade (1950s), "C" for the third circuit revision, and "1" was the Champ's circuit designation. The 5C1 circuit was extraordinarily simple, using one 6SJ7 pentode in the preamplifier section to provide a single stage of voltage amplification, one 6V6 beam power tetrode in the power amplifier section, a 5Y3 rectifier tube and a single volume knob with no tone controls.

== The Champ ==
By 1955 Fender started putting its amps in the "Narrow Panel" tweed cabinet with a plastic oxblood color grill cloth, and by this time the Champ was officially named the Champ (model 5E1). Through 1957, Champs only had a six-inch speaker, but the 1958 model 5F1 featured an 8". The 5E1 and 5F1 circuits used a 12AX7 dual triode in the preamplifier to provide two stages of voltage amplification, and a single 6V6GT power tube to produce about 5 watts. A Champ from this era can easily be dated by the code stamped on the tube chart, by the code stamped on the speaker or by its serial number.

== Blackface/Silverface ==
The 5F1 lasted until 1964, when the Champ finally made the transition to the "Blackface" style of circuit and cabinet. A small number of the last 5F1 style cabinets were covered with the "Blackface" amp cosmetics around this transition, as the factory most likely ran out of the tweed cloth covering. In 1964, a Champ with tremolo was also introduced. It was called the Vibro Champ. The Champ switched from Blackface to Silverface four years later. Fender brought back the blackface cosmetics for a short time in 1981 before discontinuing the Champ the following year.

== Champion 600 reissue ==
In 2006, Fender "reissued" the Champion 600. Cosmetically similar to the original Champion 600, internally it features a modified blackface Champ circuit (with the settings of the tone stack being hard-wired rather than adjustable via Treble and Bass controls, and a couple of additional resistors reducing input-stage gain) and a switch to solid-state rectification from the original 5Y3 tube. The current look is the TV-front with two-tone tolex and speaker grille cloth of imitation suede. After Fender took on marketing, production and distribution for Gretsch, the same electronics were available with a different look and feel – based on "tweed" Fender amps, despite the branding – as the Gretsch G5222 Electromatic. Production of the Champion 600 reissue ceased in 2010 and was reintroduced by Fender in late 2014. As of 2016, the Champion 600 was once again discontinued.

=== Specifications ===
- Available as a 6" Combo, features an internal 4 ohm speaker output jack
- 5 watt RMS
- Volume control
- Power switch
- 2 Input (high, low), 1 Channel
- 1× 12AX7 and 1× 6V6
- Solid-state diode-rectified
- Class A, single-ended
- Made in China

== Vibro Champ ==
The Fender Vibro Champ was a guitar amplifier made by Fender. It was first introduced in 1964 and discontinued in 1982. The Vibro Champ featured built-in tremolo with controls for speed and intensity. The silverface version served as a basis for the Bronco student amplifier of 1967.

== Vibro Champ XD ==
In 2007, Fender reintroduced the Vibro Champ as the Vibro Champ XD, part of their "Vintage Modified" series. Aesthetically, the XD is based on the Champ from the blackface era. Unlike the Champion 600, which has a strictly all-tube audio signal path, the Vibro Champ XD's tube circuitry is complemented by a digital signal processor (DSP) that functions as a pre-amp by modelling 16 different amplifiers. The effect of the volume, gain and tone control knobs varies according to the selected amp model. The digitally modelled signal is fed into a class-A single-ended tube circuit, with a 12AX7 output tube driver, and a 6V6 output tube. The amp also comes equipped with DSP effects, including reverb, delay, chorus, tremolo, and Vibratone (there is no spring reverb tank).

== '68 Custom Vibro Champ Reverb ==
In January 2021 Fender introduced the '68 Custom Vibro Champ Reverb as a part of their Vintage Modified series. This 5-watt silverface combo amplifier is identical to the original late-1960s Vibro Champ except for the inclusion of hall reverb, modified circuitry and a larger 10" Celestion® Ten 30 speaker.

=== Specifications ===
- Available as a 10" combo
- 5 watt RMS class-A, single-ended
- Tube-biased reverb and tremolo
- Controls:
  - Tone: volume, treble, bass
  - Reverb: level
  - Tremolo: speed and intensity, with a footswitch for toggling each effect (tremolo labeled as "vib" on footswitch)
- 2 channel, 2 input
- 1 3.2 ohm speaker output
- 2× 12AX7 and 1× 6V6
- Solid-state rectifier
- Made in Mexico

== Super Champ ==
In 1982, in order to combat its decreasing amp sales, which at that time was around 10,000 units per year, Fender hired Paul Rivera (of Rivera Amplifiers) as marketing director to specify and help design a whole new range of amplifiers to meet the contemporary requirements of musicians. Even though he did not personally create the new designs, his direction of the engineering team, headed by Ed Jahns and Bill Hughes, resulted in some legendary amps, including the Super Champ. Featuring a push-pull output, 10" speaker, and spring reverb, as well as some new circuitry; master volume, a switchable extra gain stage for a 'lead' effect, and a mid-boost switch. The Super Champ utilized 1× 12AX7 for the first and second stage preamp, a 1× 12AT7 for spring reverb driver tube, whilst the three sections of the triple-triode 6C10 compactron serve as a recovery for the spring reverb, as a driver for the phase inverter, and as a split-load phase inverter. When the volume knob is pulled, some signal from the 12AT7 reverb driver is re-routed, resulting in higher gain. An optional two-button foot-switch allowed for gain switching and reverb on/off. Two 6V6GT power tubes provide it with 18 RMS watts. The cabinet was finished in black Tolex, with a black faceplate and silver grille cloth. The speaker was offered either with the standard Fender Blue Label, or optionally with a Fender-branded Electro-Voice EVI-10. Additionally, 100 Super Champ cabinets made of oak, fitted with EVI-10, having brown/champagne faceplate and knobs, and a special grille cloth were offered as part of the Super Pro Series. The Super Champ was sold until 1986. Along with the Concert amp, it was the last tube amp to be made by Fender under CBS ownership, and the last to be made at Fullerton.

=== Specifications ===
- Available as a 10" combo, features an internal 8 ohm speaker; some with output jack, some hardwired
- Hand-wired eyelet fiberboard
- 18 watt RMS
- Controls: volume (pull for lead), treble (pull for mid boost), bass, reverb, lead level, master.
- 1-input, 2-channel
- 1× 7025, 1× 12AT7, 1× 6C10 Triple triode Compactron and 2× 6V6
- Solid-state diode rectified
- Accutronics 3-spring reverb 9.25”
- Class AB, push–pull

== Champ II ==
Introduced along with the Super Champ described above, the Champ II was the most basic of the tube amps in the "Rivera-era" range of Fenders, having no reverb or extra gain switching. It was discontinued in 1983, along with the Bassman 20 (with which it shared the same metal chassis design), three years before the rest of the range, perhaps because its dearth of features was unfashionable at the time. It had the same color scheme, power supply, output stage and stock speaker as the Super Champ but the preamp and phase inverter consisted of two 12AX7 tubes.

=== Specifications ===
- Available as a 10" combo, features an internal 8 ohm speaker output jack
- 18 watt RMS
- Controls: volume, treble (pull for mid boost), bass, master.
- 1 input
- 2× 7025, 2× 6V6
- Solid-state diode-rectified
- Class AB, push–pull

== Super Champ XD ==
In 2007, Fender resurrected the Super Champ name with the Super Champ XD, part of their "Vintage Modified" series. The look is based on the blackface model. Although for a limited period of time a special edition Blonde version was produced, Fender's Consumer Relations Department states that the blonde special edition Super Champ XD with oxblood grill was a FSR (factory special run) that was limited to only 1,000 produced. The blonde version is no longer available new and Fender has completed the amps' production run so no more will be produced or available from Fender. Unlike the Champion 600 (all tube circuitry), the Super Champ XD (like the Vibro Champ XD) is a hybrid (tube circuitry complemented with digital modeling and effects). Aside from one dual-triode 12AX7 and two 6V6 output tubes, it also has a digital signal processor (DSP) which models 16 different amplifiers and programs the volume, gain, and tone controls accordingly.

It has two channels, channel 1 being a clean channel, and channel 2 having both clean and distortion voices, using modeling technology to provide 15 additional voices. Both the Bass/Treble EQ and Effects (FX) are global settings meaning they affect the sound of both channel 1 and channel 2.

There are two stages of amplification: the first stage is done by solid-state op amps and the DSP, which also provide the desired voicing of the amps. It is then fed into the first triode of the 12AX7, which acts as a second stage preamp, provides the additional tube gain for both channels and acts as an interface between the solid-state circuitry and the tube circuitry. The second triode is a phase inverter, which creates mirror images of the signal to drive the output tubes. This arrangement provides the same feel of a complete tube amp while allowing multiple voicing. The DSP chip also provides effects, including reverb, delay, chorus, and tremolo. There is no spring reverb tank.

In 2012, Fender released the Super Champ X2, a redesign of the XD. The X2 is designed to interface with the FUSE software used by the Fender Mustang series of modeling solid-state amplifiers, and is also available in both combo and discrete head/speaker cabinet units.

=== Specifications ===
- Available as a 10" Combo, features an internal 8 ohm speaker output jack
- 15 watt RMS
- Controls: volume 1, channel select, gain, volume 2, voicing, treble, bass, FX level, FX select
- 1-input, 2-channel (clean and voicing)
- 1× 12AX7 and 2× 6V6
- Solid-state diode-rectified
- Class AB, push–pull

== Fender '57 Champ ==
Fender reissued the 1957 narrow panel tweed Champ in 2009.

== Models ==
- Champion "800" (1948–1949) – First version of the Champ.
- Champion "600" (1949–1955, 2006–2013) – Replaced the Champion "800", modified/reissued in 2006
- Vibro Champ (1964–1982; 2007–2012) – A Champ with tremolo; reissued in 2007 as the Vibro Champ XD, with hybrid (tube/solid-state) circuit, and utilization of DSP for 16 effects and voicings
- Eric Clapton Signature Vibro Champ (2013–present) – Based on the original Vibro Champ with single volume and tremolo controls in a tweed cabinet; it has custom-made Schumacher transformers and an 8" Weber speaker
- Champ II (1982–1983) – 18 watts/10" speaker.
- Super Champ (1982–1985) – 18 watts/10" speaker, channel switching and reverb. Limited Super Pro Series version also offered.
- Super Champ XD (2007–2012) – with hybrid (tube/solid-state) circuit, and utilization of DSP for 16 effects and voicings
- Super Champ X2 (2012–2016) - as per the XD, with an added USB connection for computer accessible modelling
- Champ 12 (1987–1992) – 12 watts/12" speaker
- Champ 25/25SE (1992–1994) – tube/solid-state amp
