= Fender Blues Junior =

Guitar amplifier

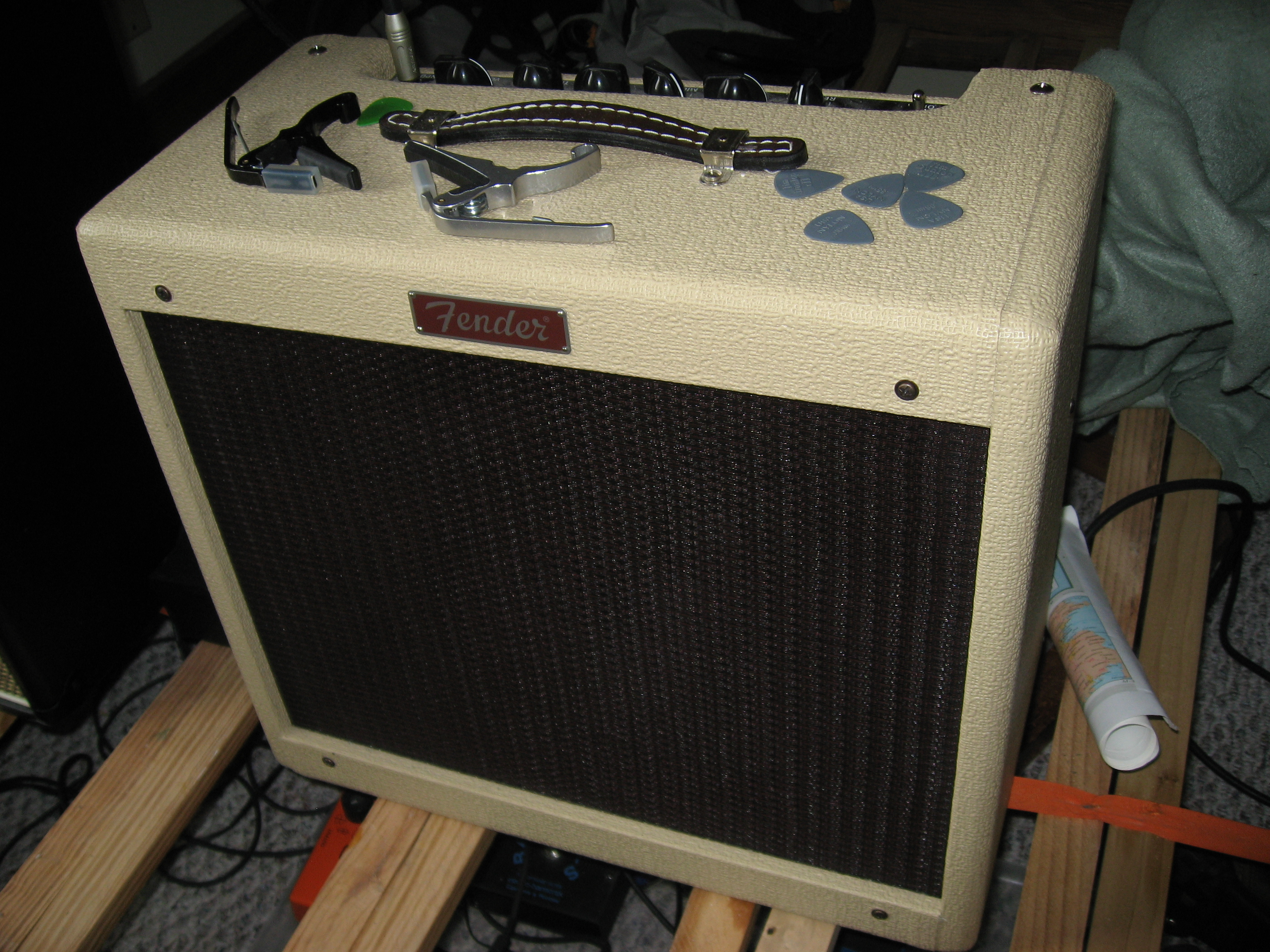
Fender Blues Junior front view

The Blues Junior is a tube guitar amplifier introduced in 1995 by the Fender Musical Instrument Corporation. It is aimed at achieving the warm, tube-driven tone common in many styles of American blues and blues rock dating back to the 1950s, while remaining both portable and affordable. A popular amp, Fender have released numerous versions since its initial release, the most recent being the version IV in 2018. Fender also frequently releases limited editions of the Blues Junior, such as the Lacquered Tweed and the "80 Proof".

== Specifications ==
- single-channel 15-watt all-tube amplifier.
- one 12-inch, 50-watt, 8-ohm driver (connected with 1/4-inch phone jack for external speaker option); model varies with edition:
  - standard edition Blues Juniors ship with a Celestion A-Type speaker
  - NOS Lacquered Tweed Limited Edition Blues Juniors ship with the Italian manufactured Jensen model C12N
  - Tweed Relic Edition Blues Juniors ship with Jensen model P12R
  - (other speaker models may be in use)
- Fender spring reverb (driven by a solid-state opamp)
- Bass, Middle and Treble tone controls
- "Fat" pushbutton switch boosts gain and midrange frequencies in preamp stage
  - also operable with optional remote foot-switch (not included)
- independent preamp and master gain controls for tube overdrive management
- "chicken head" vintage styled control knobs
- three matched Groove Tubes 12AX7 preamp tubes (graded to Fender's specifications)
- two matched Groove Tubes EL84 power tubes (graded to Fender's specifications)
- fixed power tube bias
- solid-state rectifier
- single 1/4-inch input jack

== Varying editions ==
Several limited edition versions of the Blues Junior have been manufactured since its introduction in 1995. The original circuit board underwent a major redesign in 2001, when production moved from the US to Mexico. The earlier circuit boards are green in color and are noted for a "darker," more bass-inflected tone. Many green board models have excessive noise in the reverb circuit, as the signal is inserted into the reverb after the master volume. The later circuit boards are cream or tan colored and sound "brighter" or more treble-oriented, with the reverb situated before the Master volume.

Lacquered Tweed editions, as the name implies, feature a cabinet upholstered with a lacquered tweed fabric. Some of these have been artificially aged from the factory and are known as Lacquered Tweed "Relic" editions. The "Blonde" and "Brown Tolex" Blues Juniors feature traditional Fender Tolex upholstery in their respective colors, while the Sunburst Ash edition features an ash cabinet with a sunburst stain. One edition was issued with a forest green colored cabinet, had a United States flag on the cloth speaker grille, and had United States Air Force markings detailed on the cabinet in yellow.

The standard Blues Junior is dressed like a traditional black Fender amplifier, with black Tolex upholstery and a silver cloth speaker grille.

Although they differ in their external visual aesthetic, all variants of the Blues Junior for a given year are produced with the same electronics, apart from the speaker/driver. Limited editions may use varying driver models, such as the Jensen C12N found in the NOS Lacquered Tweed Blues Junior or the Jensen P12R found in the Relic edition. Fender does not always include these limited edition versions in their updated catalogs (or on their website) either because too few were produced (only a few hundred in some cases) or perhaps because of exclusive retailer agreements.

=== Blues Junior revision history ===
Fender introduced the Blues Junior in 1995 and has revised and updated the amp periodically since then. The Blues Junior history can be divided into two major categories: the early amps with green circuit boards and the later ones with cream-colored boards. The switch to the cream-colored boards reflects the change in where the amps were manufactured, from USA to Mexico. The cream-colored board is laid out entirely differently from the green board. The biggest change is the reworked reverb circuit. The older amps tend to sound darker, while the new ones are brighter with more emphasis on treble tones.

The table Below details the revision dates and the changes made on those dates.

Revision	Board	Date	Major Change
A	Green Board	03/03/95	Product Introduction
B		05/15/95	Unknown
C		10/29/96	Revised preamp and FAT circuit
D		07/29/98	Unknown
A	Cream Board	03/21/01	Revised reverb circuit, new board layout
B		04/20/02	Added fuse on filament line
C	What about the new Black PCB Boards? Like on the Hot Rod Blues JrIV?	2003	Corrected backwards polarity on filter cap for -15V reverb supply

=== Dating a Blues Junior ===
Fender adopted a two-letter dating code in 1990. The code can be found on the Quality Assurance label located inside the cabinet. The label is often located on the bottom next to the reverb tank, sometimes it is placed on the side. The codes can be handwritten, which can occasionally make the letters hard to decipher.

YEAR	Code	MONTH	Code
1990	A	January	A
1991	B	February	B
1992	C	March	C
1993	D	April	D
1994	E	May	E
1995	F	June	F
1996	G	July	G
1997	H	August	H
1998	I	September	I
1999	J	October	J
2000	K	November	K
2001	L	December	L
2002	M		
2003	N		

Fender discontinued date codes in 2003. There is no reliable way to date 2003–2005 amps other than to ask Fender customer support to look up the date from the serial number. Amps made in 2006 have a small metal "Fender 60th Anniversary" button on the back plate. Amps from 2007 are undistinguished.

== Later versions ==
In 2010 Fender updated their line of hot rod model amps and released the "Blues Junior III," adding many physical changes to the standard black tolex model. Notable differences include the Fender "lightning bolt" speaker, "sparkle" circuit modification, rattle-reducing shock absorbers, set-screw "chicken head" knobs, "dog bone" handle, larger Fender jewel light, black non-reflective control panel, and "Blues Junior" subtext on the logo plate. In 2018, Fender released a version IV, with a new Celestion A-Type loudspeaker, reworked preamp and a "smoother taper" for the reverb.

== Tube complement and bias setting ==
A set of three matched Groove Tubes 12AX7 preamp tubes and two matched Groove Tubes EL84 power tubes, graded according to Fender's specifications, are used in all factory Blues Juniors. The Blues Junior uses a nonadjustable power tube bias (no way to vary the bias point), but it is fairly "hot" and can accommodate most matched pairs on the market. However, because they "run hot", a common modification is to add a bias trim to enable adjustments to the idle current when switching tubes.
