= Tone stack =

Type of audio filter circuit

A tone stack is a specialized type of audio filter incorporated into the circuit of an audio amplifier to alter its frequency response. The term is primarily used in reference to instrument amplifiers such as guitar amplifiers.

Guitars can produce sounds from 80Hz up to 10KHz, while guitar amps produce very little sound above around 5KHz. For discussion of tone controls, everything above 600Hz is considered to be in the treble band. Notes at 200Hz and below are in the bass range, while the sounds between 200Hz and 600Hz make up the middle band.

Tone controls work by using adjustable band-pass filters to raise or lower the perceived volume of sounds in a specific range of frequencies (or band). For example, the high-pass filter selectively lets frequencies in the treble band "pass" through the amp more easily than bass frequencies. A Bass control is a low-pass filter that produces the same effect over lower pitched sounds.

Tone stacks vary in their complexity. The simplest control is a single Tone knob that can be turned from Bass at one extreme to Treble at the other. More complex amps add Treble, Bass, and Middle controls. Some high-end amps have elaborate multiple-band audio equalizers.

Passive tone controls, like those found in guitar amps, do not increase the volume of their respective band controls. They can cut the gain in a particular tone range. Cutting the gain of one band will seem to emphasize the gain of other bands that are not cut. Shaping the tone this way will cause a small net loss in volume, but that may be overcome by increasing the volume.

== The Fender tone stack ==
The Fender Bassman was the first amplifier to standardize the tone stack design. Dubbed the 5F6-A from the Fender model number of the amp which first used it, this tone stack offered the performer the ability to control the amplifier's low, mid, and high frequency response independently.

The simplest tone stacks are derived from a bridged T network implemented with resistors in place of inductors, creating a notch filter. These will utilize 3 capacitors and 3 resistors in the form of potentiometers.
