= Fender Bandmaster =

Musical instrument amplifier

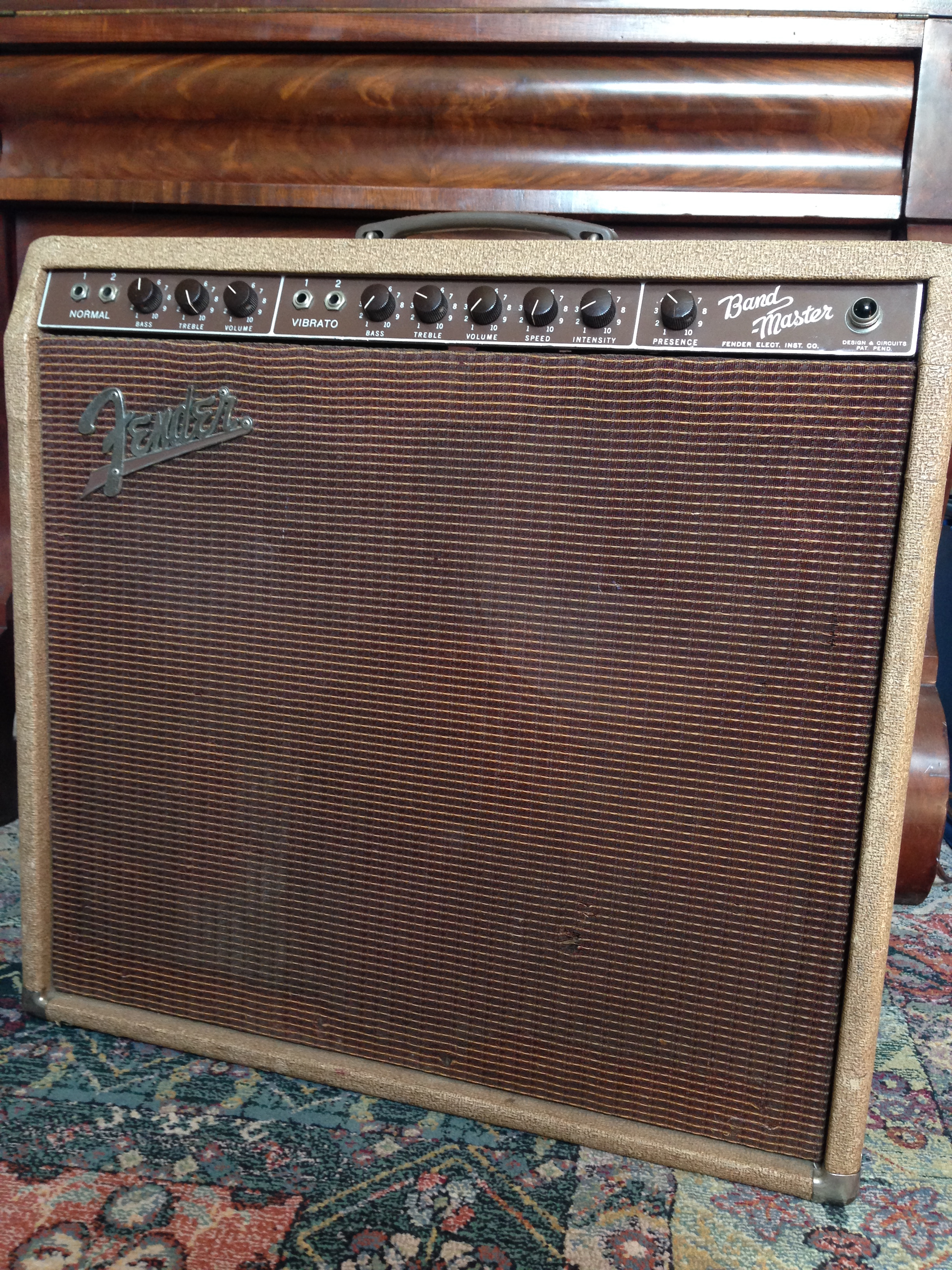
Fender Bandmaster, model 5G7, early 1960

The Fender Bandmaster was a musical instrument amplifier made by Fender. It was introduced in 1953 and discontinued in 1974. Some early models had both a microphone input and instrument inputs. Beginning in 1960, Bandmaster amps were equipped with a vibrato effect. In the 2000s, vintage Bandmaster amps remain in use by blues, Americana and rock and roll bands.

== Gallery ==
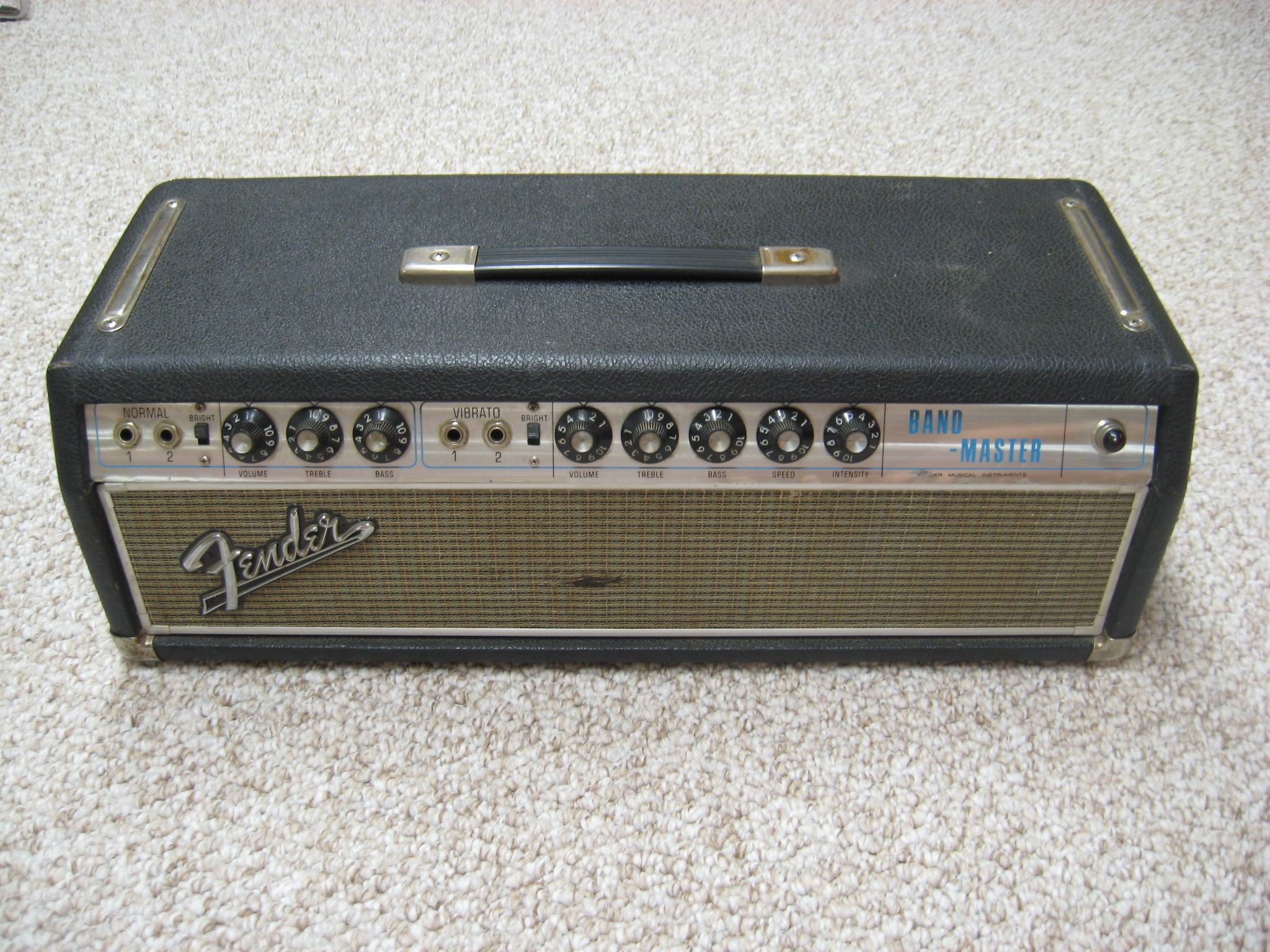
Fender Bandmaster, silverface, 1968 "drip-edge" with AB763 circuit

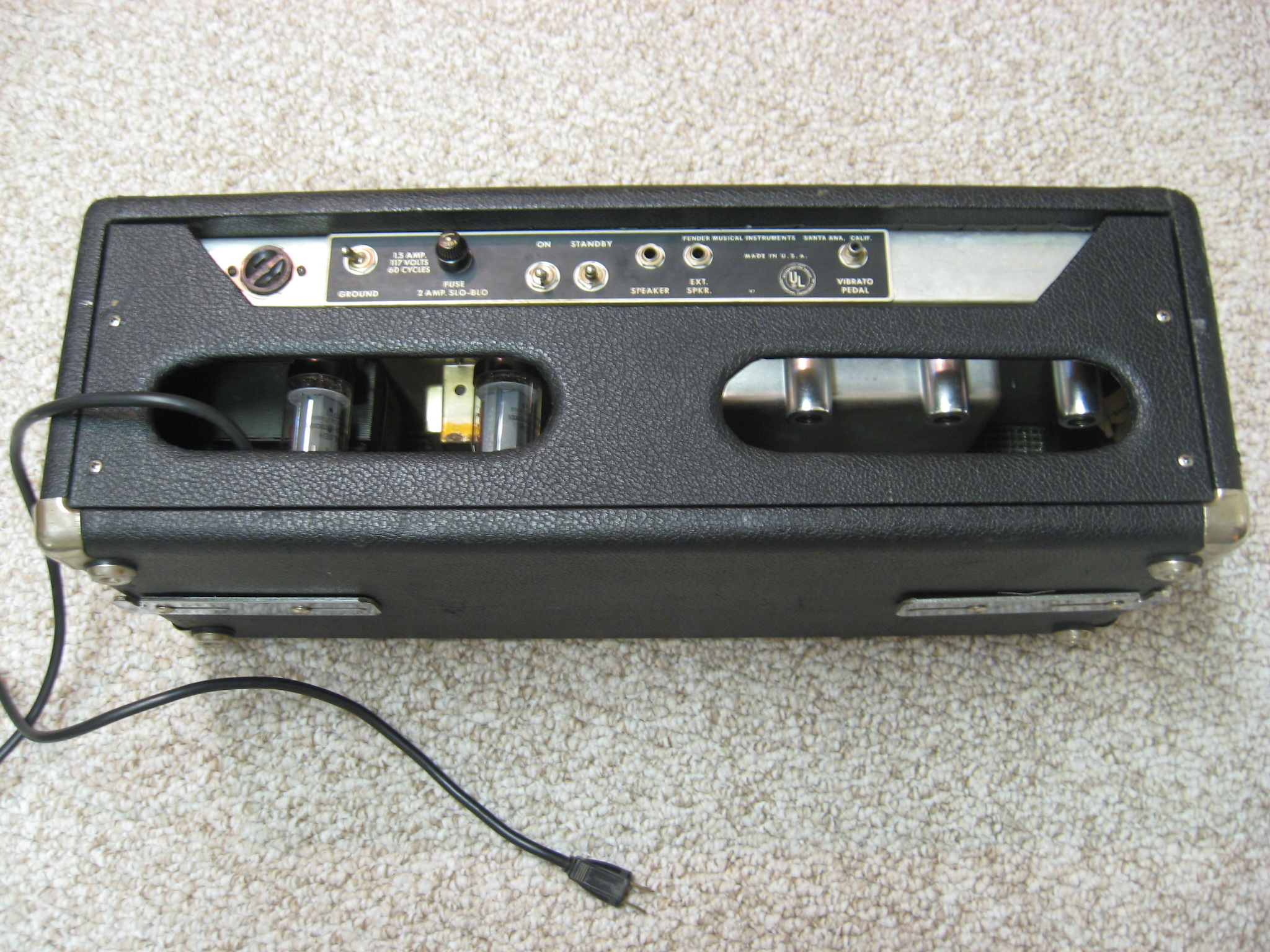
(back)
