= Jensen Loudspeakers =

American loudspeaker company

Jensen Loudspeakers is a company that manufactures speakers in many different models and sizes. Originally located in Chicago, Illinois, the company built a reputation during the 50s and 60s providing speakers used mainly in guitar and bass amplifiers. Although the American company is long out of business, "reissue" guitar speakers are currently made in Italy by SICA Altoparlanti and distributed in the United States by CE Distribution. Jensen and Rola were, for a time both under common ownership (subsidiaries of the Muter Co.), and shared various design similarities. Their 8" and 15" baskets appeared to utilize the same tooling. Rola locations took over Jensen product manufacturing when the Chicago plant closed.

The current Fender Twin Reverb amp uses two 12" Jensen C-12K speakers.

== History ==
The former Jensen Radio Manufacturing Company was founded in 1927 by Peter Laurits Jensen, the co-inventor of the first loudspeaker, in Chicago, Illinois. The company gained popularity in its early years, rising to its peak in the mid 1940s when Jensen speakers were selected to be used in the first production of a guitar amplifier by Fender Musical Instruments Corporation. Subsequently, Jensen speakers in the 40s, 50s, and 60s became commonly featured in major amplifier production, including amplifiers produced by Fender, Ampeg, and Gibson. The company also produced Hi-Fi loudspeakers for home use and was a manufacturer of OEM drivers for other brands.

Jensen Loudspeakers ceased production of their products in the early 1970s. The speakers remained heavily sought after as replacements for amplifiers originally manufactured with Jensen speakers. Following that demand, SICA Altoparlanti began reproducing "reissues" of the Jensen speakers in 1996. These speakers are designed to be as close as possible to their original design.

In 2008, SICA Altoparlanti began producing new speaker designs under the Jensen name. These speakers and the Jensen reissues are distributed in the United States by CE Distribution.

== Model numbers ==
Jensen speakers used a model number that contained 4 to 6 characters.

The first character denotes the magnet type used.

- F = Field Coil
- P = Alnico
- C = Ceramic magnet

These are listed in the order in which they were made, with the P line starting in the 1940s and the C line starting around 1960.

The next one or two characters denotes speaker size (8 = 8", 10 = 10" diameter and so on).

The last character denotes the magnet/voice coil size, and directly influences the power rating. The same magnet weights (and corresponding codes) were used on multiple speaker sizes, and the power rating increases with the increasing diameter. Ceramic magnets are roughly 45% heavier than their Alnico equivalents that share the same code.

Examples:

- K = Unknown/50 Oz Ceramic
- N = 29.5 Oz Alnico/29 Oz Ceramic (This is an exception-the Alnico version uses an inefficient ring magnet)
- Q = 10 Oz Alnico/15 Oz Ceramic
- R = 6.8 Oz Alnico/10 Oz Ceramic

These aspects together make up the speaker's model number. For example: a Jensen C8R speaker is eight inches in size, and has a 10 Oz ceramic magnet. All Jensen speakers also include a date and manufacturer's code. Jensen's source code is 220. Accompanying the company specific (EIA) code (220) is the last digit of the year and the 2 digits of the week manufactured, creating a 6 digit code usually imprinted on the speaker edge or the magnet housing. Thus a code of 220534 would denote a Jensen speaker manufactured in either 1945, 1955, or 1965 on the 34th week of that year. Most speaker (and other electronic component) manufacturers began adding the last 2 digits of the year in the 1970s, so the 6 digit code became a 7-digit code. In the '40's, Jensen would sometimes omit the leading zero of a single digit week, which would reduce the total number of characters to 5.
