= Tolex =

Vinyl material

Tolex is a trade name for a flexible, waterproof, vinyl material used as a cover material for books, upholstery, guitar amplifiers, cases, and other products.

Tolex was filed as a trademark on August 30, 1945, by the General Tire, and was registered as "a plastic sheet and film material for book binding and case covering for speakers and amplifiers". General Tire was disconglomerated, and the trademark expired in 2005.

TOLEX is a Canadian trademark and brand of OMNOVA Solutions, Fairlawn, Ohio, now part of Synthomer.

== Usage ==
It has been used in Fender amplifiers, the Fender Rhodes electric piano, and guitar cases from various manufacturers. Tolex was also used in Packard automobiles, Henney-Packard hearses and ambulances of the 1950s, and in marine applications, such as Chris-Craft boats and other watercraft.

Musicians sometimes use "Tolex" as a generic description for any vinyl type covering on an amplifier or guitar case, but most are not actually Tolex brand, except for Fender- and Rickenbacker-related products. Fender, today, uses textured vinyl, not Tolex.
