= Mesa/Boogie Rectifier =

Line of guitar amplifiers made by Mesa/Boogie

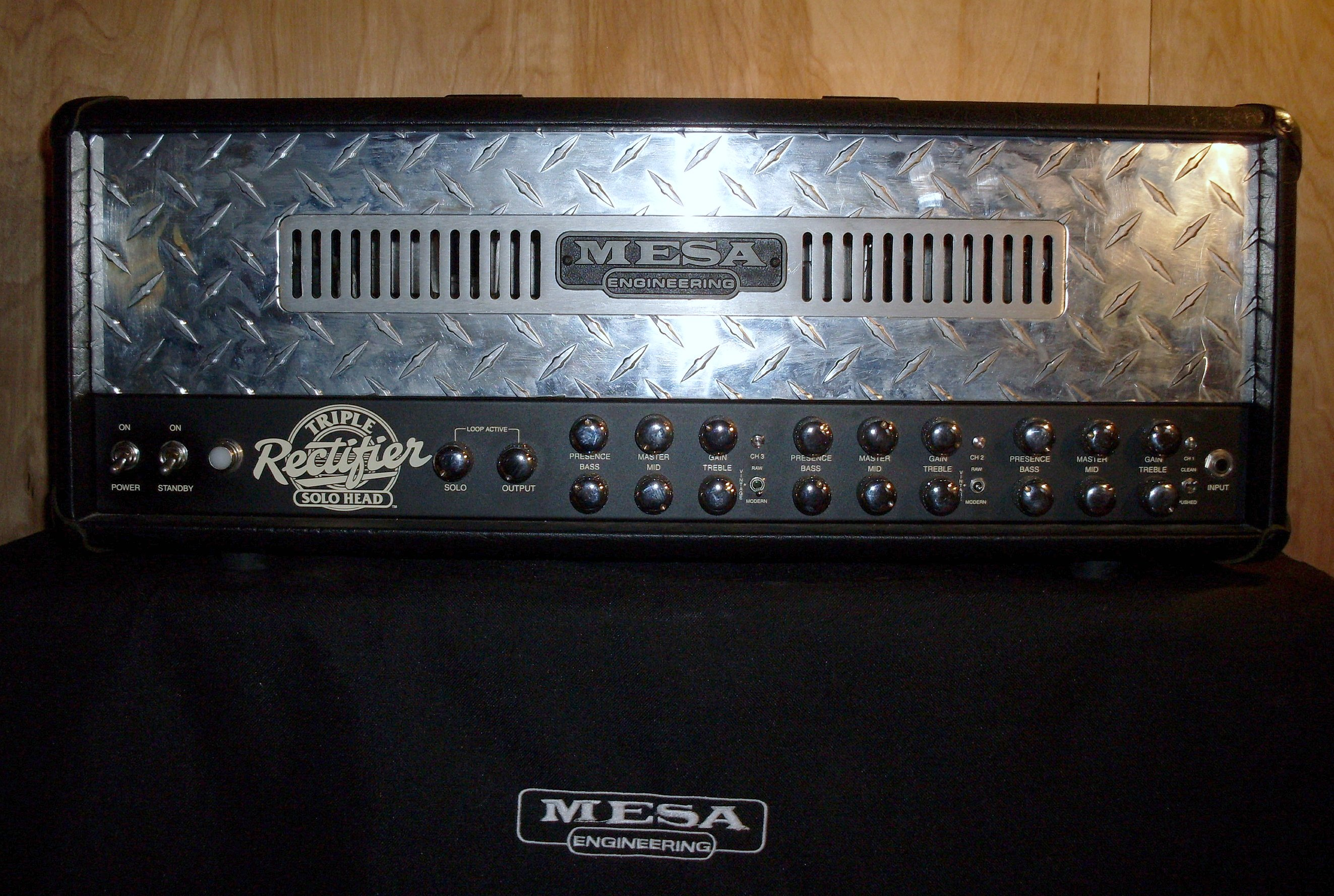
A Mesa/Boogie three-channel Triple Rectifier Solo head.

The Mesa/Boogie Rectifier Series is a line of guitar amplifiers made by California-based manufacturer Mesa/Boogie. Introduced in 1992, the line's first model was the Dual Rectifier, which is often described as the definitive amp of rock music in the 1990s for its widespread use across multiple rock genres in the decade after its release. The Dual Rectifier, alongside its more powerful sibling, the Triple Rectifier, is characterized by its "raw, aggressive bass-heavy" tone, as well as its industrial aesthetic. Its success led to Mesa/Boogie releasing an extensive line of Rectifier-branded amps.

== History ==
=== Development ===
Hard rock and metal guitarists increasingly sought heavier tones throughout the 1980s, and many guitar techs, such as Michael Soldano and Reinhold Bogner, turned from modifying amps to building their own boutique models to satisfy demand. Faced with this increasing competition, Mesa/Boogie began developing a new, higher-gain model of their own in 1989, dubbed the "Dual Rectifier" in reference to it including both tube and silicon diode power amp rectification. Compared to the brand's earlier Fender-inspired Mark Series, the Dual Rectifier was intended to produce a more "modified British" voicing in an intentional move to change the brand's identity. Mesa/Boogie first created two distinct prototypes, known as Revisions A and B, before settling on the Revision C circuit for the Dual Rectifier's debut. Mesa/Boogie founder Randall Smith stated that he and the amp's other designers took inspiration from the local Bay Area hot rod scene, especially what Smith observed to be the "harmonics" of pushed V8 engines at a garage next door to the company's headquarters. Smith later described the amp's circuit as "revolutionary," noting that, unlike most other amp models, the Dual Rectifier was not based on an earlier amp design.

=== Release ===
Upon its launch in February 1992, Mesa/Boogie initially feared they had brought the Dual Rectifier to market too late, as its initially intended market—hair metal—had been suddenly overtaken in popularity by genres like grunge and punk. In response, Mesa/Boogie updated the amp's circuit multiple times into 1994. This resulted in Revisions D through G, as well as the introduction of the Triple Rectifier, which did not have three rectifier methods but rather included three rectifier tubes and increased the model's wattage from 100 to 150. Revision G solidified the amp's signature sound and remained in production until 2000. Guitarists across a wide swath of rock genres quickly adopted the Rectifiers, including artists in grunge (Alice in Chains, Soundgarden), alternative (Foo Fighters, Bush), punk (Bad Religion, Blink-182, Sublime), and metal (Metallica, Tool, Rammstein). The Rectifiers became especially associated with the burgeoning nu metal genre and bands like Korn, Limp Bizkit, and Linkin Park, as the amps' prominent low-end was ideal for handling the down-tuned and seven-string guitars characteristic of nu metal. In 2000, Mesa/Boogie switched from the original two-channel Rectifier designs to three-channel versions, which remained in production until early 2010, when they were superseded by the current Multi-Watt models.

From 1993 until 2004, the Rectifiers represented over half of Mesa/Boogie's entire business, greatly exceeding the company's expectations. Given its widespread use among rock guitarists in the 1990s, the Dual Rectifier is often described as the definitive amp of the decade in that genre, while Music Radar wrote that it is "arguably the most important high-gain guitar amp of all time."

== Design ==
The Dual Rectifier was Mesa/Boogie's take on a "big, monster-metal [amp] head." It was intended to look threatening compared to the brand's earlier Mark series amps, and to that end featured a diamond-patterned tread plate as a front panel, with metal knobs and black leatherette covering. Premier Guitar described the Rectifier's aesthetic as "tough-guy industrial." To further differentiate the Rectifier from the company's previous offerings, Mesa/Boogie did not use their traditional, "friendly" Boogie logo, choosing to instead badge the new amp and cabinets as MESA Engineering, which had always been the official company name.

The original Dual Rectifier model was a 100-watt head, with five 12AX7 preamp tubes, a pair of 5U4 rectifier tubes, and four 6L6 power tubes. It had two channels: Orange (with "Clean" and "Vintage" modes) and Red (with "Modern" mode). The amp also had the ability to swap "Vintage" and "Modern" modes between the two channels via a "Channel Style Select" switch. The amp's use of both tube and silicon diode power amp rectification provided players a choice of modern, tight, fast attack (diode) or a smoother, vintage-style attack and sag (tube) via a "Rectifier Select" switch. Other features included a "Bias Select" switch for changing between the stock 6L6 and EL34 power amp tubes and a "Bold/Spongy" variac switch. Early production models (from 1992 to 1994) had a series effects loop and then a parallel effects loop starting with Revision G in 1994. Revision G became the most widely used version, with Guitar World describing its "massive, tight low end, throaty mids and super-saturated gain" as the Dual Rectifier's signature sound. The three-channel Dual and Triple Rectifiers introduced in 2000 added a Green channel for dedicated cleans, which many players had requested, as well as new voicings: "Raw," "Vintage," and "Modern" (Orange and Red channels) and "Clean" and "Pushed" (Green channel). These models were replaced in 2010 with new Multi-Watt editions, which introduced power attenuation to the series by allowing players to reduce any channel's output to 50 watts.

With the Triple Rectifier, the wattage was increased to 150 with six 6L6 power tubes; it also included three 5U4 rectifier tubes and five 12AX7 preamp tubes. Although the extra wattage did not result in substantially more volume, the additional tubes had an effect on the amp's tone, allowing for more headroom and a tighter low end.

== Models ==
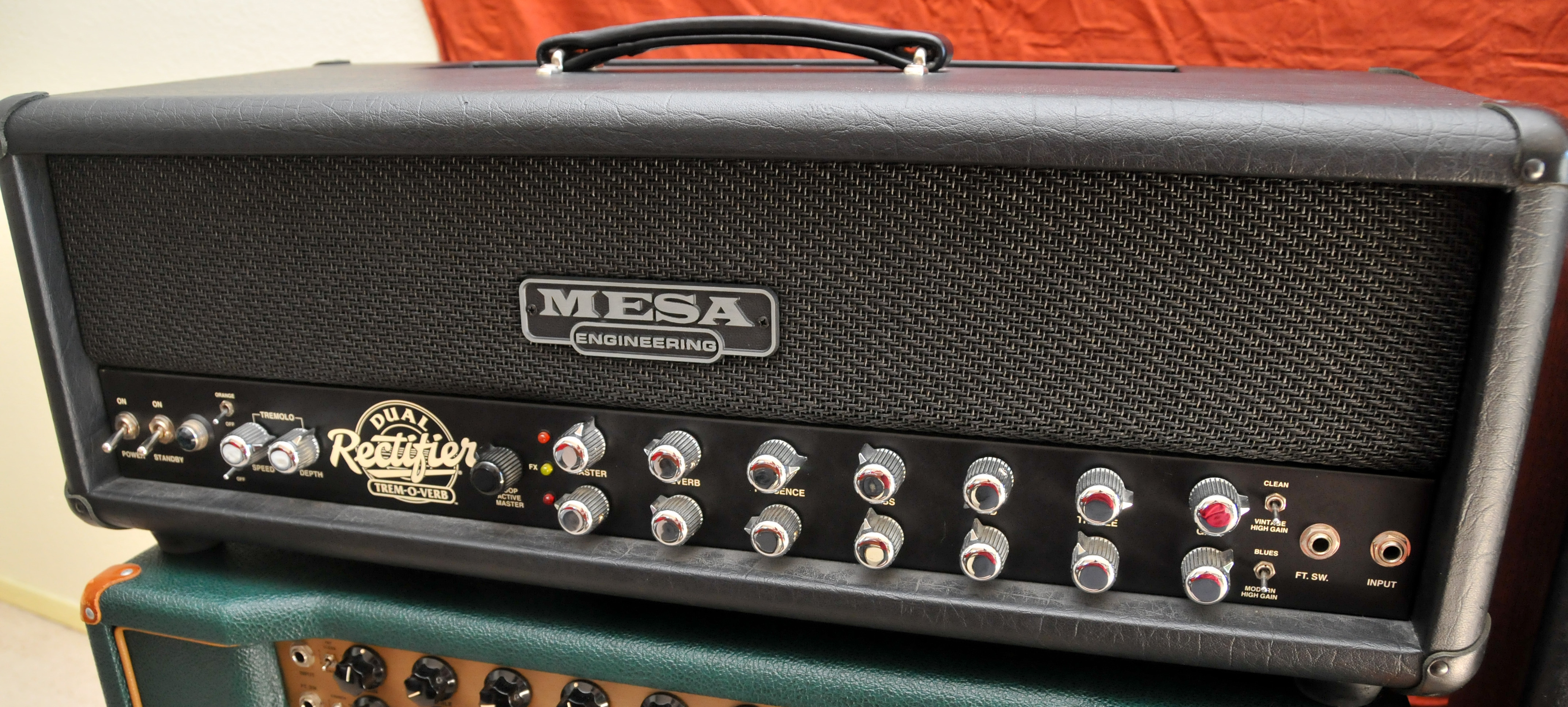
A Trem-O-Verb.

=== Dual Rectifier ===
- Solo Head (1992–2010)

The original, 100-watt models of the series. The initial two-channel Solo heads, consisting of Revisions C through G, were replaced in 2000 by three-channel variants. These amps introduced a Green channel for clean and low-gain tones via new "Clean" and "Pushed" modes, while adding a "Raw" mode to the Orange and Red channels.

- Trem-O-Verb (1993–2002)

The Dual Rectifier-branded Trem-O-Verb model added both reverb and tremolo effects to the Rectifier circuit, while maintaining the Solo Head's 100-watt, two-channel format. Mesa/Boogie sought to expand the Rectifier's appeal with the Trem-O-Verb, omitting the treadplate front panel and adding a new "Blues" mode. The amp was offered as both a head and 2x12 combo.

- Maverick (1994–2006)

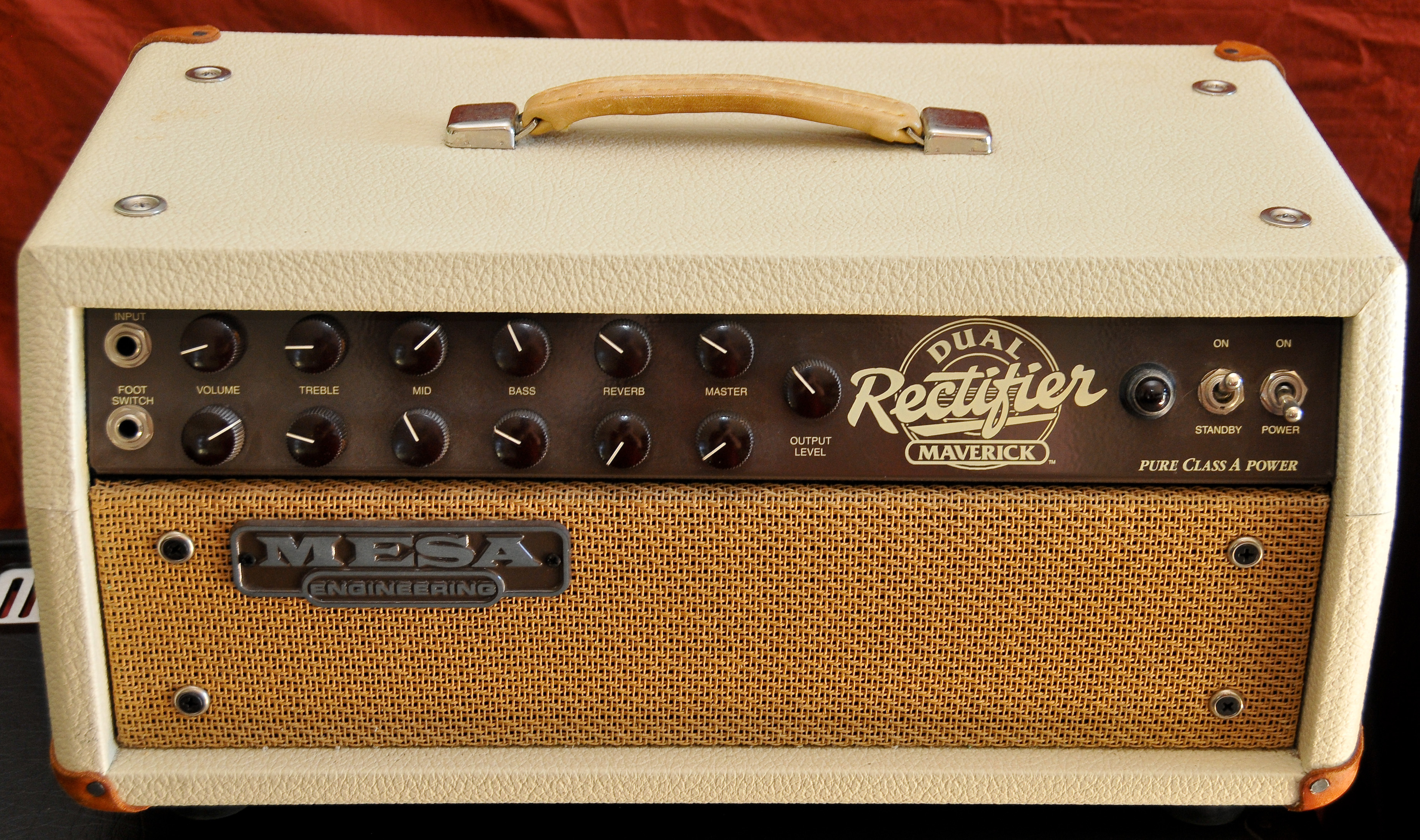
A Maverick head.

The Maverick was designed for mid-gain styles of music, with 35 watts of Class A power using four EL84s, six 12AX7s, and a 5AR4 tube. The amp combined two different channel-based preamps with "vintage" voicings, with the power amp reconfiguring to match each preamp when switching channels.

- Blue Angel (1994–2003)

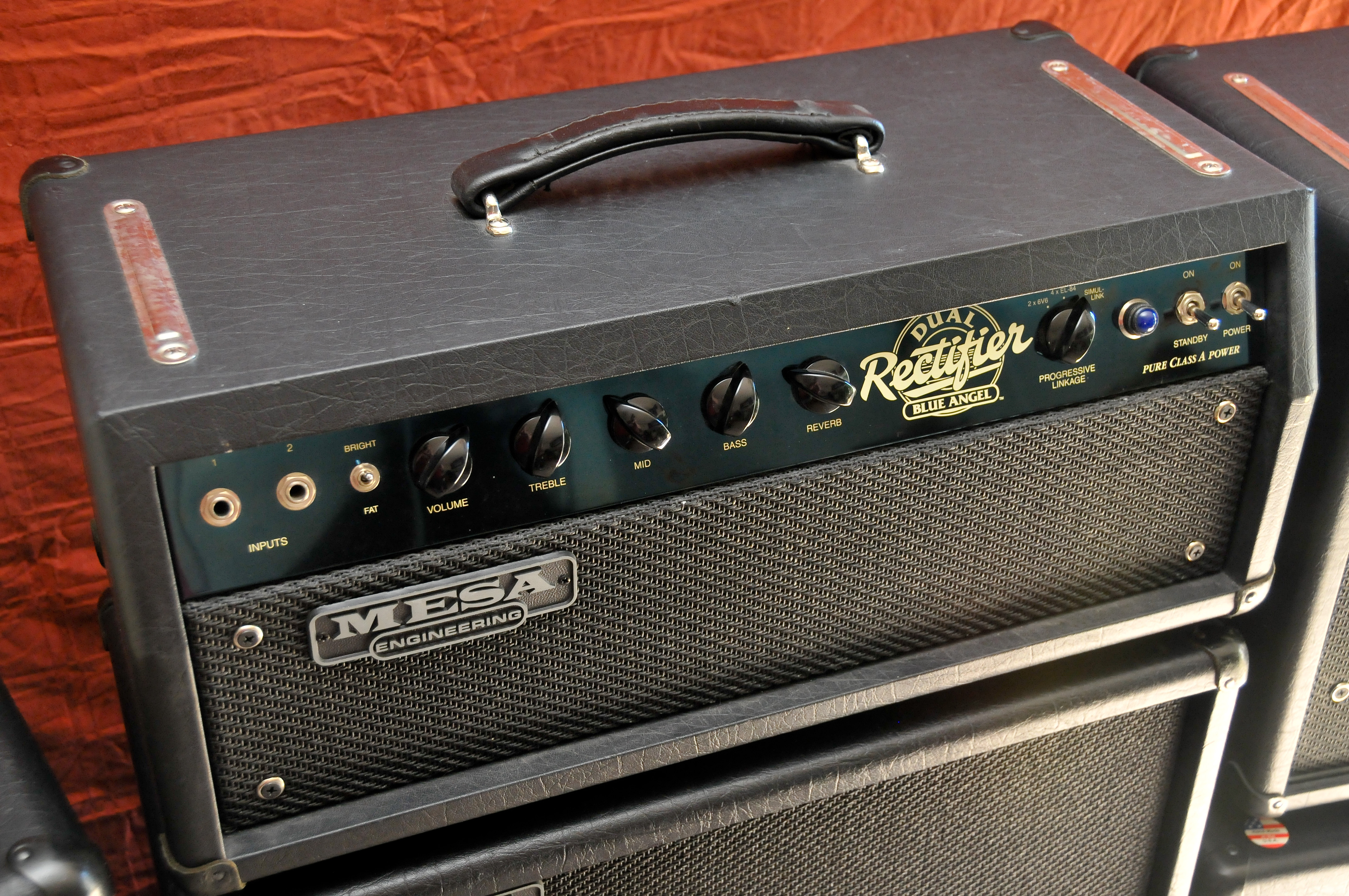
A Blue Angel head.

The Blue Angel was a single-channel amp that returned to a more Fender-inspired sound. Its defining feature was the inclusion of both 6V6 and EL84 power amp tubes and the ability to use either of them or combine them for different tones and wattages, a feature the brand called "Progressive Linkage." The model was offered as a head and 1x12 and 4x10 combos. Despite its Rectifier branding, the Blue Angel did not include the ability to switch rectification method.

- Road King (2002–2017)

With the Road King, Mesa/Boogie introduced new four-channel Rectifier models with expanded clean and lower-gain options in channels 1 and 2. New modes for these channels included "Fat," "Tweed," and "Brit." The Road King also included the Blue Angel's Progressive Linkage (using four 6L6 and two EL34 tubes) and "Multi-Watt" power attenuation, with channel-assignable outputs of 50, 100, or 120 watts.

- Roadster (2006–2017)

The Roadster was a simplified, "plug and play" version of the Road King, removing the Progressive Linkage option as well as several other back-panel features.

- Multi-Watt (2010–present)

The original Solo Heads were replaced in 2010 with new Multi-Watt models, which brought in the brand's power attenuation, allowing users to reduce any channel to 50 watts of output.

- Recto-Verb 25 (2013–present)

The Recto-Verb 25 was created in response to requests from players who wanted a combo version of the "lunchbox" Mini Rectifier head. Mesa/Boogie opted to include reverb and launched it as a new model with both a head and a combo with a single 12" speaker.

- 90s Dual Rectifier (2025–present)

In 2025, Mesa/Boogie released the 90s Dual Rectifier, a reissue of the model based on the specs of the amp's original production run.

=== Triple Rectifier ===
- Solo Head (1993–2010)

The Triple Rectifier increased the Dual Rectifier Solo Head's output to 150 watts. However, despite its name, the Triple Rectifier featured only two rectification methods. Like its sibling, it started as a two-channel amp, then expanded to three channels in 2000 with a Green channel for cleaner tones.

- Multi-Watt (2010–present)

The Multi-Watt model introduced power attenuation to the Triple Rectifier.

- 90s Triple Rectifier Solo Head (2026, limited edition)

A reissue of the original Solo Head model, with a "blacked-out" aesthetic consisting of Black Bronco vinyl covering, black diamond plate grill, and black knobs.

=== Single Rectifier ===
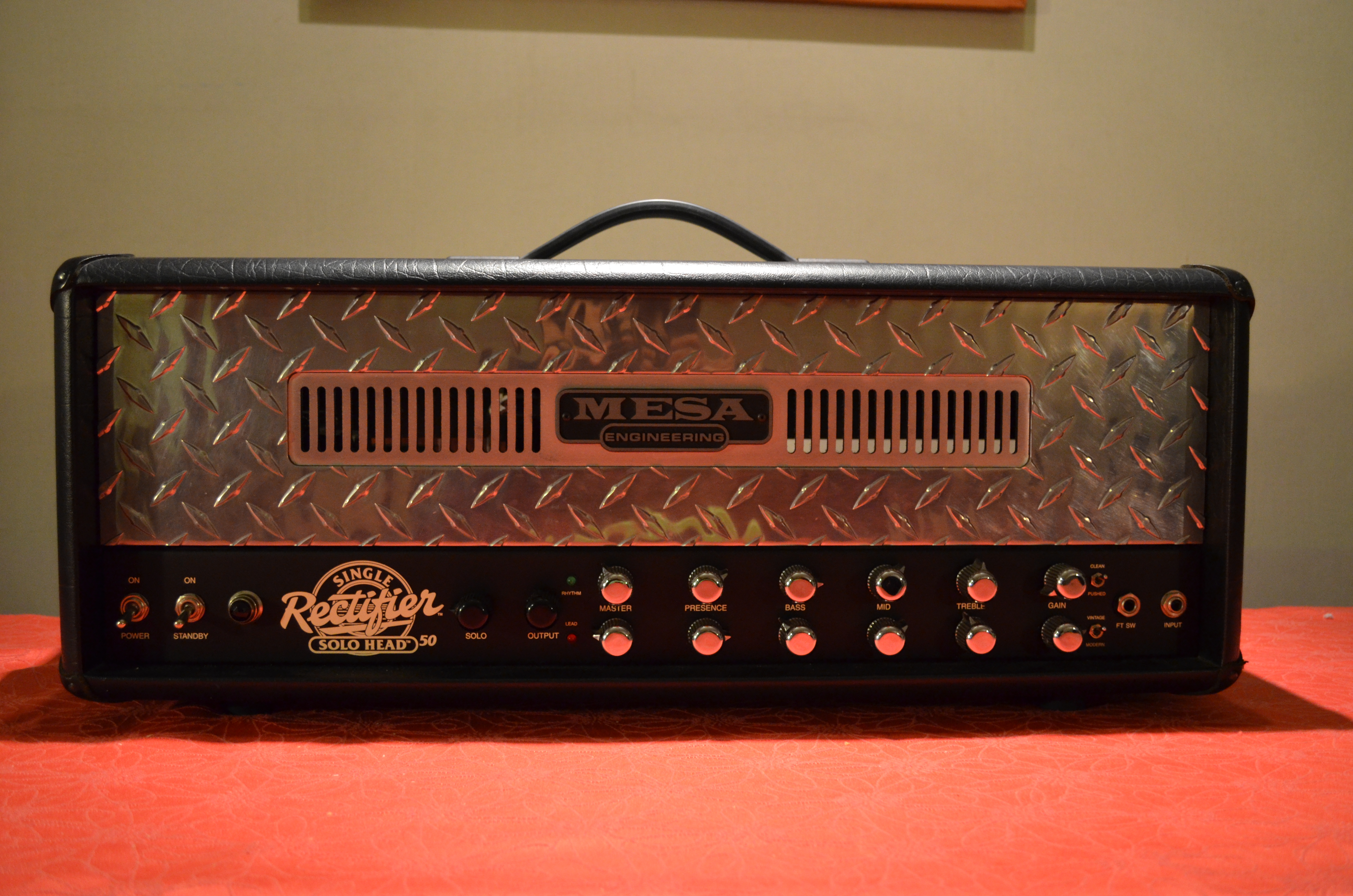
Solo Head 50

- Solo Head 50 (1998–2011)

The Solo Head 50 took the two-channel Dual Rectifier design and lowered its output to 50 watts by reducing the power amp section to a pair of 6L6 tubes. The Solo Head 50 offered only diode rectification.

- Rect-O-Verb (1998–2011)

The Rect-O-Verb added reverb to the Solo Head 50 circuit.

=== Other versions ===
- Rectifier Recording Preamp (2002–2017)

The Rectifier Preamp utilized six 12AX7 preamp tubes and featured two channels, a clean channel using the modes introduced in the Road King and a second channel using the traditional overdrive modes from the Orange and Red channels of the Dual and Triple Rectifiers. It was offered exclusively in a two-space rackmount format.

- Mini Rectifier 25 (2011–present)

With the Mini Rectifier, Mesa/Boogie entered the low-wattage "lunchbox" amp head market. The Mini Rectifier includes two channels with switchable 10 or 25 watts of output and an EL84 power section.

- Badlander 100 and 50 (2020–present)

The Badlander models represent a significant update to the Rectifier line, with the preamp and power amps both redesigned, in part to stay tighter in the bass frequencies and more pleasing on the top end. The Badlanders use EL34 power tubes as standard and have two channels with new modes: Clean, Crunch, and Crush. They are also the first Mesa/Boogie models to use "CabClone," a built-in cabinet simulator and reactive load.

== See also ==
- List of Mesa/Boogie users
- Mesa/Boogie Mark IIC+
- Soldano SLO-100
