= Soldano SLO-100 =

Guitar amplifier made by Soldano

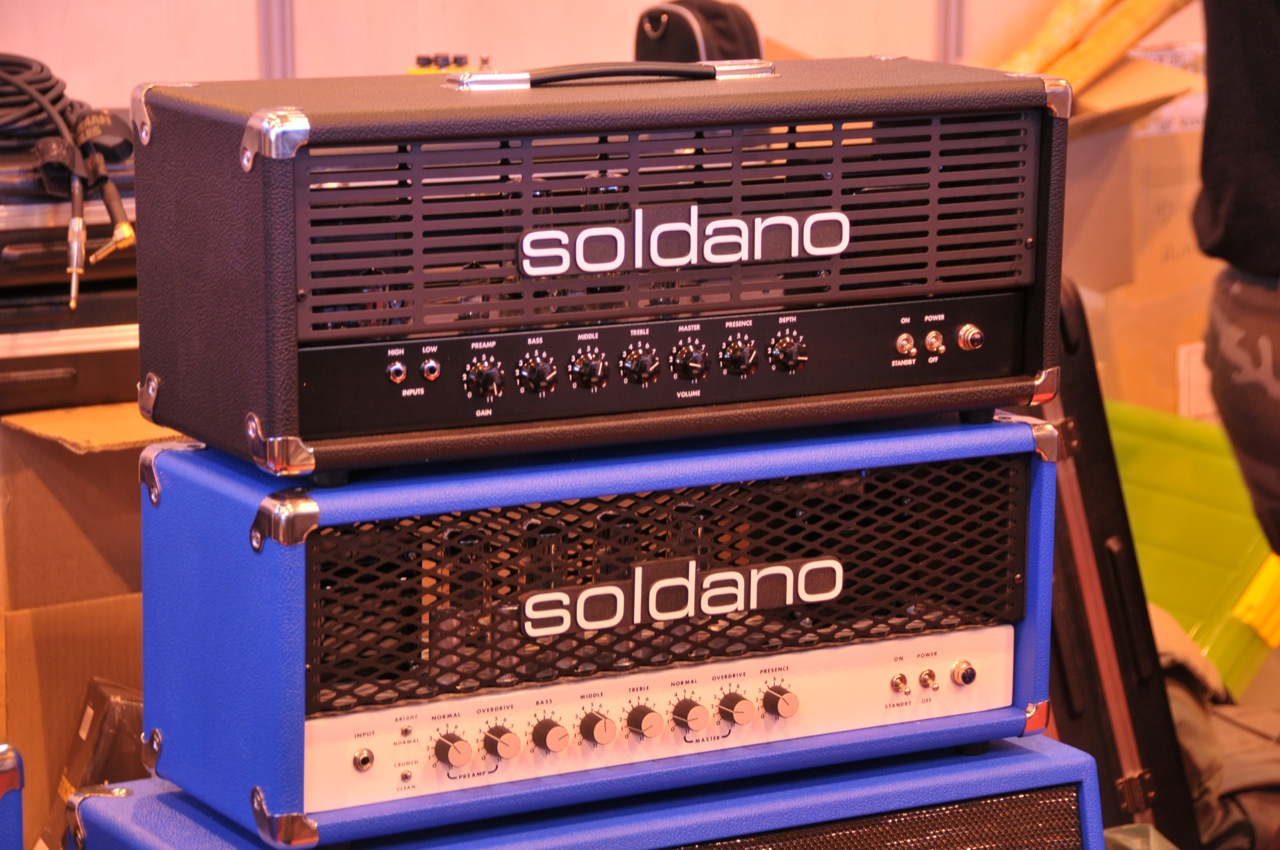
Two Soldano heads: an Avenger Hot Rod (top) and an SLO in custom blue tolex.

The Super Lead Overdrive 100, typically shortened to SLO-100, is the debut guitar amplifier from Mike Soldano's Soldano Custom Amplification. Released in 1987, the SLO-100 was designed by Soldano to offer contemporary lead guitarists a hand-built, high-gain amplifier that would not lose clarity and dynamics with heavy distortion. Hard rock and metal guitarists like Eddie Van Halen, George Lynch, and Mick Mars helped popularize the SLO-100 and its high-gain sounds, while the amp's clean and lower-gain tones attracted players like Eric Clapton, Mark Knopfler, and Warren Haynes. The SLO-100 is considered one of the industry's benchmark amps and its success helped establish the boutique amplifier market.

== History ==
By the mid-1980s, guitarists in hard rock and metal were limited in their pursuit of high-gain sounds to Mesa/Boogie amps like the Mark IIC+ or Fender or Marshall amps that had been "hot-rodded" with often expensive modifications by an amp tech—such as Mike Soldano—to produce heavier, more aggressive tones. Soldano traveled back and forth between his native Seattle and Los Angeles, taking gigs as a roadie to make ends meet while developing a prototype amp that would produce the amount of distortion he wanted. This "high-gain" amp design, which he named the Super Lead Overdrive 100, was first showed to Heart guitarist Howard Leese in 1987. Soldano quickly received orders from players like Lou Reed, Michael Landau, and Vivian Campbell. He then moved to Los Angeles and debuted the SLO-100 at the 1987 NAMM Show.

The SLO-100 was an immediate success, its thick, heavy distortion proving attractive to lead guitarists like Joe Satriani, Warren DeMartini, George Lynch, and Mick Mars. Eddie Van Halen used an SLO-100 during the early 1990s to record For Unlawful Carnal Knowledge and later based his own signature model amp, the Peavey 5150, on it. Meanwhile, Campbell, Adrian Vandenberg, and Steve Vai all used SLO-100s during their turns with Whitesnake. The amp's lower-gain tones found prominent fans too, in Eric Clapton, Mark Knopfler, Gary Moore, and Warren Haynes. Haynes convinced Dickey Betts to briefly play an SLO-100 in the Allman Brothers Band.

From the early 1990s until 2018, Mike Soldano and a small team of employees built the SLO-100 and the brand's other amps by hand in a Seattle workshop. In 2018, he sold his company to Huntington Park, California-based Boutique Amps Distribution—which also builds amps for brands like Friedman Amplification and Tone King—but stayed on as an advisor. The company's product line was "rebooted" in 2020 under B.A.D. with the flagship SLO-100 receiving multiple player-requested features. A version closer to the original specs, known as the SLO-100 Classic, is also produced.

== Design ==
Vintage Guitar wrote that the SLO-100 was difficult to describe through typical references to previous amps. The magazine described the SLO-100 as having a "generally more American high-gain tone" like a Mesa/Boogie Mark series amp or a hot-rodded Fender, but said it could also provide a Marshall-style "Brit-rock crunch." Vintage Guitar concluded that Soldano's amp stood on its own as "a high-concept modern design rather than a modified vintage circuit." With the SLO-100, Soldano felt he had achieved a "high-gain sound without losing a lot of the fundamental character of the initial note." He also explained that while it was important to maintain the guitar's clarity and detail, he also "wanted to overdrive the hell out of it."

The SLO-100 features two channels, Normal and the higher-gain Overdrive, which share a four-band EQ (Bass, Middle, Treble, and Presence) but have independent gain and master volume controls. The Normal channel also has a toggle switch for choosing between Clean and Crunch modes. The amp's 100 watts of power are provided by four 6L6GC power tubes, which contribute to its tight low-end, while using solid-state rectification and a significant amount of filtering. Having cloned a Mesa/Boogie Mark II from the early 1980s as a formative DIY project, Soldano employed a similar cascading-gain preamp structure in the Overdrive channel of his amp, which added a thickness to its "high-gain sizzle." The preamp structure consists of two stages of 12AX7 preamp tubes for the Normal channel, which are then combined with another two when switching to the Overdrive channel. The signal then passes through a buffered effects loop, a tone stage based on a modified Fender Bassman topology, the master volumes for each channel, and finally a phase inverter. A key part of the SLO-100's success is that its overdriven tones are created entirely in the preamp and therefore it does not require "ear-splitting" volume levels to sound its best like many other amps.

Guitar World described the SLO-100's Overdrive channel as providing "tight, dynamically expressive and harmonically rich high-gain tones and smooth attack," and wrote that the Normal channel offered "very distinctive clean tones that are crisp and slinky." A common aftermarket modification to the SLO was the addition of a Depth control to its power section to add low frequency attenuation; this mod later became a standard feature.

SLO-100 base-models come stock with a black tolex covering, but can be ordered in purple and snakeskin variants.

== Legacy ==
The SLO-100 is one of the guitar industry's benchmark amplifiers. Premier Guitar credited the SLO-100 with having "set the standard for high-gain amplification," noting its "searing harmonics and the perfect balance of gain, sustain, and tight touch response." Soldano's success with the SLO-100 helped inspire the following generation of techs-turned-builders in the late 1980s and 1990s, with Guitar World crediting Soldano with founding the boutique amplifier market.

Since its release, Soldano has offered multiple iterations of the SLO-100 sound and circuit to make it more accessible to players. In 2021, Neural DSP released an official SLO-100 Suite audio plug-in. The next year, Boutique Amps Distribution released the inexpensive, 30-watt, solid-state SLO Mini head. Soldano then joined the "amp-in-a-box" overdrive pedal market with the SLO Pedal, based on the SLO-100's Overdrive channel. The brand later introduced a two-channel version of the pedal, the SLO Plus, to include tones based on the SLO's Normal channel.

== See also ==
- Marshall JCM800
- Mesa/Boogie Rectifier
