= Mesa/Boogie Mark Series =

Guitar amplifier series

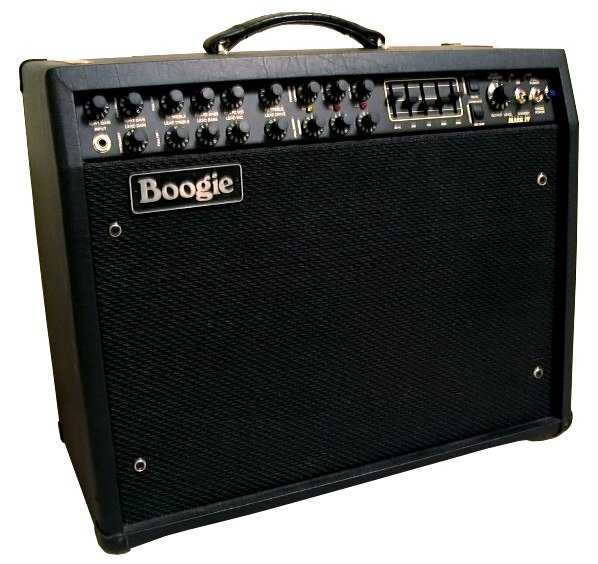
Mesa-Boogie "Mark IV", a guitar combo amplifier

The Mark Series is a line of guitar amplifiers designed and produced by California-based manufacturer Mesa/Boogie since 1972. The first "Boogies," as they were originally known, were based on a Fender Princeton modified by company founder Randall Smith to produce more volume and distortion. The resulting production model, the Mark I, was popularized by guitarists like Carlos Santana and Keith Richards and helped establish Mesa/Boogie as a brand. A Mark II model followed, introducing amplifier milestones like channel switching and effects loops. The line was revoiced in 1983 with the Mark IIC+ variant, which brought a more aggressive sound with a more pronounced midrange and tighter lows. Metallica would famously use the IIC+ on Master of Puppets, a major factor in it later becoming one of the industry's most coveted vintage amp models. Despite its success, the IIC+ was produced for little more than a year. The Mark series, with its constantly-expanding feature set, maintained its status as Mesa/Boogie's flagship offering through Mark III and Mark IV iterations before being supplanted by the Rectifier series in the early 1990s. Mesa/Boogie has since released Mark V and Mark VII models, as well as a John Petrucci signature version and a IIC+ reissue.

== Mark I ==
In the early 1970s, dissatisfaction with existing amplifier models among many guitarists led to a trend of technicians "hot rodding" Fender amps to produce more distortion. One such technician was Randall Smith, co-owner of Prune Music in San Francisco, who modded a Fender Princeton (a small 12-watt amplifier) owned by his friend Barry Melton of Country Joe and the Fish by replacing the amplifier section with that of a powerful Fender Bassman and installing a 12" JBL D-120 speaker instead of the original 10" while otherwise maintaining the amp's outward appearance. Despite the mod being performed as a joke, Smith was impressed with the result and showed it to frequent Prune Music customer Carlos Santana. Santana played the unassuming "Princeton" and exclaimed, "Man, that little thing really boogies!"

Smith's modded-Princeton "Boogies," as they were known, had two input channels, a cleaner, blackface-voiced input for rhythm playing and a higher-gain input for leads. This lead channel produced more gain than any production amp model, allowing notes to sustain for much longer. Smith produced between 150-200 Boogies before the supply of used Princetons ran out, and with demand only continuing to increase, Smith turned to producing his own amplifier model out of a converted dog kennel. These new Boogie amps—of which Smith ultimately made around 3,000—pioneered what became known as a "cascading gain circuit": in this case, three gain stages (four, if using the lead input) were wired in series and configured to "spill over" one into the next as the control panel's gain settings were increased; this allowed the preamp to be pushed into distortion regardless of how much signal was sent to the output stage. The result was a "sizzling, ultra-saturated preamp distortion" that had not been heard before. Unlike non-master-volume amps of the time, the power amp is not relied on to produce distortion in such a design. Boogies were offered with customizations like snakeskin-patterned tolex or hardwood cabinets and the inclusion of a five-band graphic equalizer.

One of the more notable amps in the series was built in 1977, with serial number A804: this was the first amp built for Keith Richards in a long collaboration between Smith and the Rolling Stones that started when the Rolling Stones' manager asked Smith for free amps and Smith refused. Smith later talked to Richards and they agreed that he would send the band an amp, and the Stones would pay for it or return it. Richards ended up using the amp for the El Mocambo 1977 show, and over the years the Stones received (and paid for) over forty of Smith's amps.

Following the release of the Mark II, the Boogies became known as the Mark I.

=== S.O.B. (Son of Boogie) ===
The S.O.B. was introduced in the Mark IIC era. These amps were made from May 1982 to December 1985. Serial numbers started with 0100 and ended on 2390. This was Mesa/Boogie's first attempt at having a reissue of the Mark I. It had two cascading gain inputs and its controls were Volume(gain) 1, Volume(gain) 2, Master, Treble, Bass, Middle, Limit or Presence (depending on the version). No foot-switching available, however an A/B splitter pedal could be used to select input 1 or input 2 separately. There was also a reverb option which came available in the latter units. These amps had a point-to-point wired power section and had large transformers with great headroom. Most were built in a 60 watt version and later a few in the 100 watt. SOB chassis were shared with other heads, but had different front and rear plates. EQ, slider cutouts and other 1/4" jack cutouts can be seen from inside the chassis.

== Mark II ==
=== Mark IIA ===
Mesa/Boogie released the Mark II—later renamed the Mark IIA—in 1978. The Mark IIA introduced selectable modes (or channels) that could be operated with a provided footswitch. A fifth gain stage was added for the new higher-gain Lead mode, which had its own gain and master volume controls, as did the lower-gain Rhythm mode. The Mark IIA also introduced the use various push/pull switches that could alter various aspects of the amp's sound. The 1/4" jack previously marked "1" was changed to just "Input", and "2" was changed to "Foot Switch." Common issues with the amp were an audible popping noise when switching modes and noisy reverb units.

=== Mark IIB ===
The Mark IIB is credited as the first guitar amplifier with a tube-buffered effects loop. However, the loop was placed between two critical gain stages, and tended to overdrive some instrument level effects, and also caused volume pedals to act as remote gain controls for the lead mode. Mesa later implemented a mod that caused the effects loop to become more transparent, and smoothed out the lead channel, similar to the IIC+'s lead channel. More importantly, it marked the introduction of Mesa/Boogie's "Simul-Class" system, where two of the power tubes (always 6L6s) run in class AB pentode while the other two tubes (either 6L6s or EL34s) run in class A triode. In a simul-class amp, running all four tubes generates approximately 75 watts RMS of power; running only the class A tubes produces about 15 watts. Also available were non-simul-class Mark IIBs in both a 60 watt version and a 100 watt version that allowed shifting down to 60 watts by turning off a pair of power tubes.

The Mark IIB's front control panel is identical to that of the IIA. The two input jacks on the front panel are marked "Input" and "Foot Switch." The front panels read Volume, Treble, Bass, Middle, Master, Lead Drive and Master. It has "Pull Bright" on the Volume, "Pull Shift" on the Treble, and "Pull Bright" on the Master. The Rear control panel was altered to accommodate the FX Send and Return jacks.

=== Mark IIC & IIC+ ===
The Mark IIC finally remedied the two major problems of the IIA and the IIB: the previously noisy reverb circuit and a footswitching system that produced a popping noise when activated. The Mark IIC featured a quieter footswitching system based on optocouplers to reroute the signal, and a new mod to the reverb circuit. The reverb modification involved resistor swaps and a change in ground lead placement. That mod[ification] is still on the books of 'official' mods, which they send to their authorized techs; it runs about $50." Mesa/Boogie no longer does this modification at its own factory. The Mark IIC also featured a new Pull Bass shift on the front panel, which slightly extended the low frequencies in the preamp.

The Mark IIC+ was the last of the Mark II series and featured a more sensitive lead channel - due to its featuring a dual cascading drive stage - whereas the IIA and IIB had a single-stage drive circuit. The IIC+ also had an improved effects loop. Unlike earlier Mark II models, pedals configured for instrument-level input signal could be used without the amp's signal overloading their inputs. However, the volume pedal option on the Mark IIB cannot be implemented on Mark IIC+s.

The "+" designation is sometimes misinterpreted by owners and sellers as indicating the presence of an equalizer. The misconception may stem from the mid-1980s, when Mesa/Boogie renamed its Studio .22 model to Studio .22+, a revision that incorporated internal improvements such as updated wiring. Across the Mark II series, a graphic equalizer was an optional feature rather than a defining characteristic. As a result, the “+” designation does not imply the inclusion of an equalizer. For example, a Mark IIC+ may denote a 100-watt amplifier without either equalization or reverb.

A "+" amplifier can typically be identified by a hand-written black "+" mark located on the rear of the chassis directly above the point where the power cord connects. Despite this, some dealers price Mark IIC+ models at a premium without accurately understanding the designation and may not know where to locate the mark. The marking itself is not definitive, as it can be forged. For verification, owners may contact Mesa/Boogie and request confirmation using the amplifier’s serial number. Approximately 1,400 Mark IIC units were produced before the transition to the Mark IIC+. Additional distinctions can be found on the front panel. The Mark IIC features a "Gain Boost" pull switch integrated into the master volume control. The Mark IIC+ replaces this with a "Pull Deep" bass boost function. However, certain Coliseum series Mark IIC+ units retained surplus "Gain Boost" faceplates, and units upgraded from earlier Mark IIC models typically retain their original panels. There are also early transitional Mark IIC+ units, particularly in the 133xx serial number range, that display "Gain Boost" labeling on the panel even though the function operates identically to the later "Pull Deep" implementation.

12 Factory C+s with switchable ++ are known to exist, before this idea was used in the Mark III, with the ++ being developed further to become the R2 channel on the III.

== Mark III ==
The Mark III was launched by Mesa/Boogie in 1985. It introduced a third channel, a "crunch" rhythm sound right in between the rhythm and lead channels. This amp has a dual footswitch system: one footswitch alternates between the current rhythm mode and the lead mode, and the other selects either the clean rhythm mode or the crunch rhythm mode. The two rhythm modes share all of their controls, while the lead mode only shares the rhythm modes' tone stack, featuring independent gain and master volume controls. The physical switch for the crunch rhythm mode was implemented as a push/pull switch above the Middle frequency control. Most Mark IIIs have presence and reverb on the back (except for long chassis') unless not desired by the buyer; Graphic EQ was also optional all in either head or combo format.

The Mark III went through multiple revisions, similar to the Mark II. Each revision had a slightly different voicing, but identical functionality. Non-Simulclass versions of the Mark III came in either 60w RMS with two 6L6s or 60w/100w with four 6L6s in the power section. Mark IIIs contain either four or five 12AX7 tubes in the pre-amp section, depending on if they have the reverb option. Simul-class Mark IIIs usually contain two 6L6s in the inner sockets and two EL34s in the outer sockets for 15w/75w use.

=== Black Stripe (1985 & Early 1986) ===
These are distinguished by either the absence of a marking, a black dot, or a black marker stripe above the power cord entry. Early 100W and Simul US Voltage Black Stripes retained the same 105 power transformer as the IIC+, which is easily distinguished by its larger physical size than the later-introduced Mark III transformer. IIC+ non US voltage export power transformers and IIC+ output transformers are also seen in these models.

Most Black Stripes also re-used the faceplate from the Mark IIC+. This resulted in the first pot being labelled with Volume 1 in instead of the later Volume label. Furthermore, the pull function label above Middle knob was hand-etched onto the face plate resulting in a slightly different look than the other labels on the faceplate. Towards 1986, a new PCB revision was installed which enabled an additional component to be switched on when R2 was activated. This board was re-used in the Purple Stripes, although with a different revision number and different lead circuit component values.

=== Purple Stripe (1986) ===
The second revision was the "Purple Stripe" Mark III, which featured a purple marker stripe above the power cord. This amplifier was identical in component values and R2 channel as the later Black Stripes, but had a lead section much closer to a IIC+

=== Red Stripe (1987) ===
The third revision was the "Red Stripe" Mark III which featured a red marker stripe above the power cord. The amplifier had lead mode circuitry almost identical to the IIC+ and some minor changes in the preamp to make it similar in circuitry to a IIC+. A further PCB board revision with revised R2 channel was introduced which forces Treble Shift on when in R2 mode. The power circuitry and presence cap remained identical to the previous stripes however.

=== Blue Stripe (1988) ===
The fourth revision was the "Blue Stripe" Mark III which featured a blue marker stripe above the power cord. The lead channel was voiced so brightly, it is considered to be the most aggressive Mark Series Boogie ever introduced. The presence cap and voltage rating of some of the orange drops in the power section were also altered to mirror that of the IIC+

=== Green Stripe (1989) ===
The final revision was the "Green Stripe" Mark III, which was only available in a Simul-Class format. It was identical to the Blue Stripe, apart from having its overall gain reduced, except for the wiring of the outer two Class A power amp tubes which were switched to Pentode operation instead of Triode for a 10w RMS increase over previous Simul-Class amplifiers (15w/75w) making 25w/85w.

Mesa ultimately ended the Mark III's production since it overlapped with production of its successor, the Mark IV, which was introduced in 1990. Mark IIIs were still in steady production around 1994, and finally ceased as late as 1997, 11 years after their launch.

== Mark IV ==
The Mark IV was launched by Mesa/Boogie in 1990 as a three-channel amp - with independent controls for all three channels, except bass and mid, which are the same for both Rhythm 1 (clean) and Rhythm 2 (crunch). The "crunch" channel is designed for use by hard rock and heavy metal rhythm guitarists. There were two versions of this amp. Mark IVs built from the start of production until about September 1993 are referred to as version A; amplifiers made from late 1993 until the end of production in 2008 are known as version B. Early Bs have an attached power cord, like the A version. Some differences: Version A has no stereo effects loop or footswitch for reverb, and the lead channel is much like the Mark IIC+s. Version B has switchable reverb, a single switchable stereo effects loop, and an output to drive another power amp. Its voicings are altered slightly. Both versions are highly regarded; production of the Mark IV ceased in 2008 after an 18 year production run.

== Mark V ==
The Mark V was introduced in early 2009. Much like its close cousin, the Triaxis Preamp, it features many voicings based on previous Mark Series amplifiers. It has three distinct channels, each with their own pre-gain three band tone stack, gain, master, and presence controls. Each channel also has three modes, which control several of the amplifier's 49 relays to mirror the circuit being modelled. The Mark V introduced a channel-assignable graphic EQ. Older Boogies were equipped with graphic equalizers, but these did not allow the same flexibility. Each channel has a toggle switch able to select between EQ active, off, or foot-switched. Similar to the Express and F-series amplifiers, the graphic EQ also had channel-assignable contour-knobs.

The Mark V - like its predecessor - comes standard in a Simul-Class format, but with a twist: early Simul-Class power amps were configured for SC-75 watt operation, or A-15 watt operation, or an increase of 10 watts when in pentode mode. The Mark V is biased warmer to produce an output of SC-90 watts, AB-45 watts, and Single-Ended A-10 watts, similar to the Lone Star. Channel-specific Multi-Watt toggles dictate the power amplifier's operation class.

=== Mark 5:25 ===
The Mark 5:25 was introduced in 2014. It is a smaller, two-channel version of the Mark V. The output section contains two EL84 tubes which can be switched between 10 and 25 Watts. It also features a built-in CabClone which can be used to emulate a speaker cabinet while driving headphones for silent playing, or a direct-in (DI) box for recording or sound reinforcement applications.

The combo version "Mark Five: 25™ 1x10 COMBO" was introduced in 2020, the dimensions are 14 3/4"(H) x 14 1/8"(W) x 9 3/8"(D), with an 8 Ohm Celestion G10 Creamback speaker inside and weight 24 Lbs.

=== Mark 5:35 ===
The Mark 5:35 was introduced in 2015. It is based on the Mark 5:25 and features two channels. The output section contains four EL84 tubes which can be switched between 10, 25, and 35 Watts. Additional solo controls were added for independent volume switching. It is also available as a combo and a head. The combo is a similar size to the Mark I combo. It also features cab clone.

== JP-2C John Petrucci Signature Head ==
The JP-2C was introduced in 2016. It is a 3-channel 100-watt "revival" of the Mesa Mark IIC+ designed in part with Dream Theater guitarist John Petrucci, who is well-known for using a Mark IIC+ in the studio. The three channels are based upon the original channels of the Mark IIC+, but with two high gain channels based on the IIC+'s lead channel. The second and third channels are very similar, with the third channel having a slight increase in gain. There is also a “Shred” setting, which further emphasizes upper harmonic content on the two lead channels. It also features two separate graphic EQs, which can be selected for each channel via mini toggles on each channel's front panel. It is also the first Mesa amp to feature MIDI connections, which can control the channel switching, as well as controlling the FX loop and graphic EQs. Much like the Mark 5:25, the JP-2C features a built-in CabClone. The amp also features a switch to drop the amp's wattage down to 60 watts for use in smaller venues or recording.

== Mark VII ==
The Mark VII was introduced on March 7, 2023. It features many voicings based on previous Mark Series amplifiers. It has three distinct channels, each with their own pre-gain three band tone stack, gain, master, and presence controls. Each channel also has three modes, and have MultiWatt functionality that allows each channel to be set at 90, 45, or 25 watts. This amplifier introduces two new modes: Mark IIB on channel 3, and Mark VII on channel 2. It also utilizes Mesa CabClone IR technology, allowing the amplifier to be run silently without being connected to an external load for silent recording using channel-assignable impulse responses.

== See also ==
- Soldano SLO-100
