= Guitar amplifier =

Electronic amplifier for musical instruments

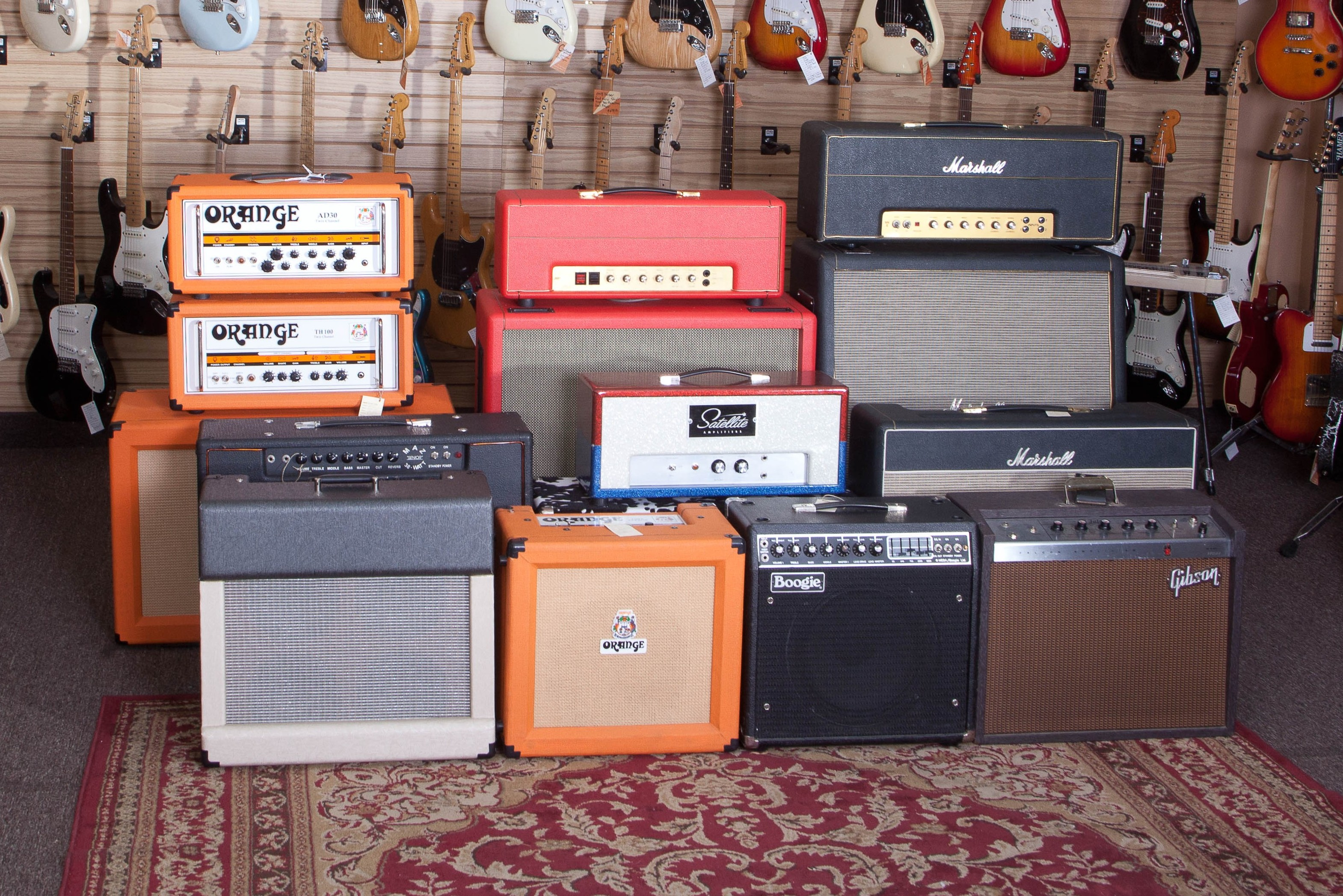
A collection of guitar amplifier heads, cabinets, and combos.

A guitar amplifier (or guitar amp) is an instrument amplifier designed for use with an electric guitar, bass guitar, or acoustic-electric guitar. A guitar amplifier receives an electric guitar's pickup-generated signal and shapes that signal's tone through a preamplifier and amplifies it through a power amplifier; it is then projected through loudspeakers. When the preamp and power amp circuits are combined with one or more loudspeakers in a single enclosure, it is known as a combo. When the preamp and power amp are housed together for use with an external speaker cabinet, it is known as a head.

There is a wide range of sizes and power ratings for guitar amplifiers, from small, low-wattage practice combos to heavy, high-wattage heads that are usually paired with large external cabinets. The components chosen for an amp's circuit have a significant impact on its tonal character, which can be further sculpted by emphasizing or de-emphasizing certain frequencies using equalizer controls and through producing distortion (also known as overdrive). Reverb is a common built-in effect.

Commercially available guitar amplifiers were first released in 1928 but did not become widely used until the introduction of mass-produced solid-body electric guitars and basses in the 1950s. Notable brands include Fender, Marshall, Vox, and Mesa/Boogie. For players, their choice of amp and the settings they use are a key part of their sound. Historically, guitar amplifiers have been designed around vacuum tubes, and to a lesser extent solid-state electronics; digital amplifier modeling is also increasingly common. Guitarists often use external effects pedals to alter their tone before the signal reaches the amplifier.

== History ==
=== 1920s–1940s: Early models ===
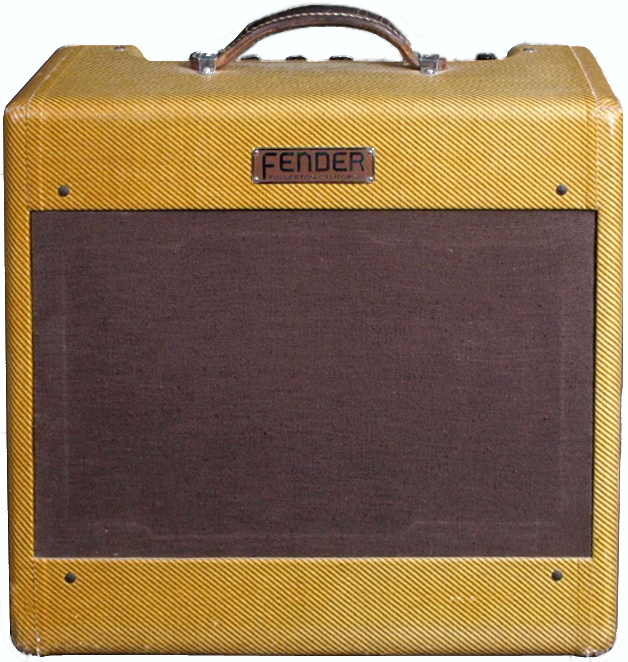
Fender Deluxe 1953

High-powered audio amplifiers were first developed for use as public address systems and in movie theaters. While initially bulky and expensive, technological developments in the 1920s allowed for smaller, portable models that became popular among musicians playing a variety of instruments, especially lap steel guitars. The first commercially available guitar amplifiers were released in 1928 by the companies Stromberg-Voisinet and Vega, although at the time there was little difference between these early amplifiers and portable PA systems. Models released through the mid-1930s typically used a thin, wooden cabinet, a metal chassis with no control panel, a single volume control, and one or two inputs. Power amp sections typically used output transformers built into their field coil speakers and generated under 10 watts of power, while their speakers were small, usually under 10 inches. Electro String Instruments released its first amplifier in 1932. Their design—using a small, rectangular wooden box with a cutout for a speaker and a handle on top—would serve as a template for other, pre-WWII models. An early pioneer of electric guitar, Alvino Rey used his Electro amp on hundreds of gigs and recordings at the time. In 1933, Dobro released its own amp model to compete with Electro's, whose amp would be updated with metal corners and a different grill cloth and released in 1934 under the Rickenbacker label. In 1935, Electro/Rickenbacher sold more amps and electric guitars than all the amps and electrified or electric guitars that had been made from 1928 through the end of 1934. Gibson also developed prototype amps around this time, but never released them.

In the mid-1940s, K&F Manufacturing released their first amplifiers, low-wattage combos with steel casings and no covering. The K&F partnership was short-lived, however, with co-founder Leo Fender starting his own namesake brand, Fender, to continue producing amplifiers, as well as electric guitars and basses. Fender's first amps had wooden enclosures and were characterized by wide control panels that made them resemble television sets of the time. Like pickup models of that era, these early amplifiers were not loud enough for use on stage: when players turned their amps up all the way, the signal clipped, losing high and low frequencies but gaining compression, harmonics, and a "musical type of distortion". While an unintended technical shortcoming, players embraced it and amp distortion would go on to become closely associated with the electric guitar. One such amp known to distort at high volumes, the Fender Deluxe of 1948, became regarded as one of the earliest amp designs to achieve iconic status. Like other Fender amp models in the 1940s and 1950s, the Deluxe came in a Tweed-covered cabinet.

=== 1950s–1960s: Rock and roll ===
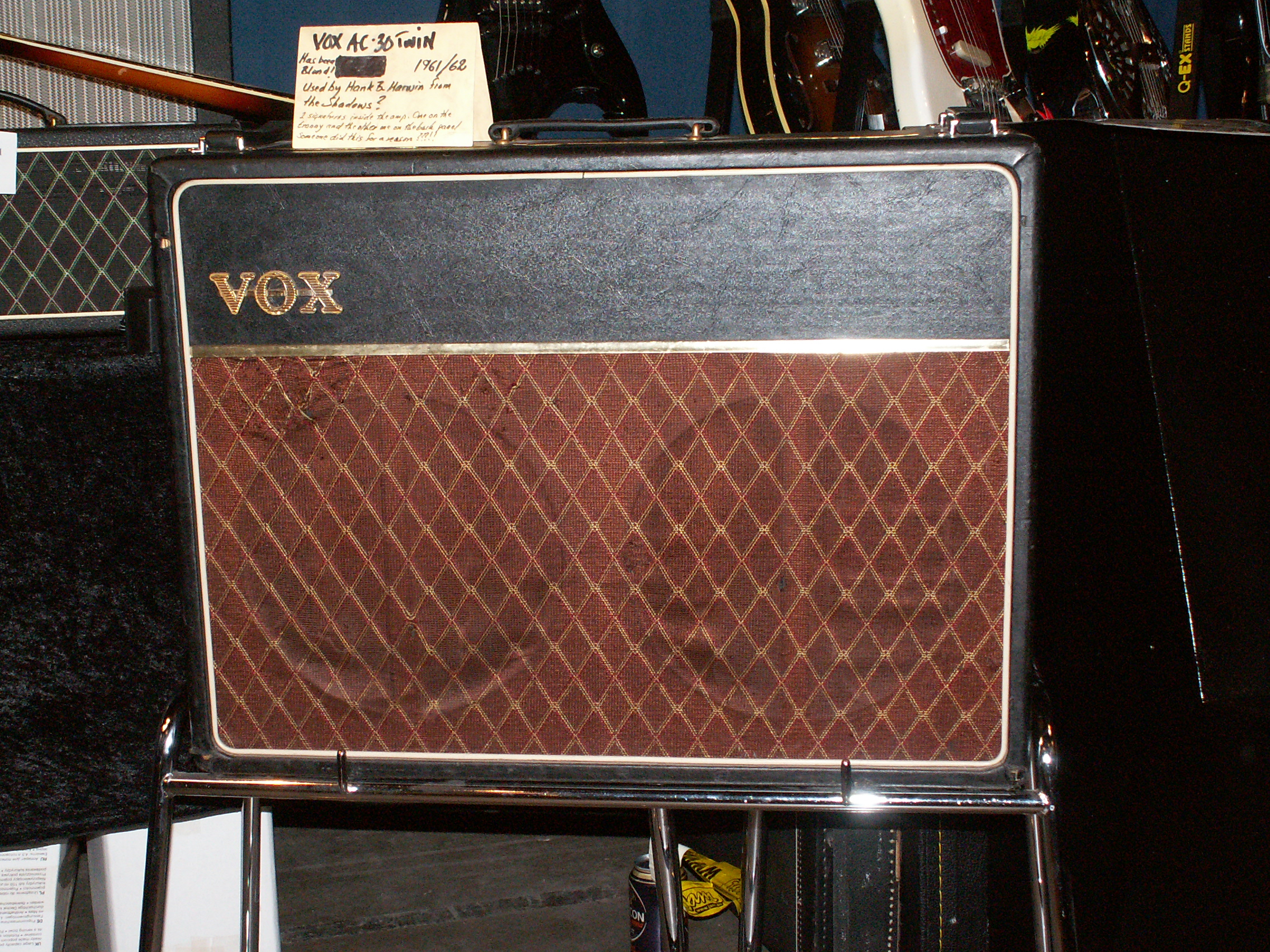
A Vox AC30

In 1950, Fender debuted its first mass-produced, solid-body electric guitars, the Esquire and Telecaster (then known as the Broadcaster). Using a solid-body design eliminated the unwanted feedback caused by pickups on acoustic jazz guitars when they were amplified. Fender released the Twin in 1950 and followed in 1952 with the bass-oriented Bassman. While the Twin excelled at clean tones, the Bassman's distortion at loud volumes became popular among both bassists and guitarists. The Bassman later served as inspiration for Marshall's debut amp model, the JTM45. Vox released its AC30 combo in 1959 and then updated the amp in 1960 as a three-channel model that became famous for its jangly tone and widespread use during the British Invasion. In response to players like Pete Townshend of The Who who wanted more power, Marshall released the 100-watt 1959 Super Lead in 1965. The JTM45 and Super Lead were heads, which combined the preamp and power amp in a dedicated enclosure that was paired with an external speaker cabinet. Pairing the Super Lead with one or more 4x12 cabinets became known as the "Marshall stack". The combination has been used by many notable guitarists of the era and played a major role in shaping the sound of rock and roll.

Throughout the 1960s, Fender continued updating the circuits and cosmetics of their amplifiers. Fender's Twin Reverb of the mid-1960s became a standard amp model for "clean", undistorted tones. Hiwatt's DR103 was similarly highly regarded as a loud, clean amplifier and has frequently been associated with David Gilmour. In 1965, Peavey released its first amp models, which used transistors rather than the standard vacuum tubes, which had been replaced by solid-state technology in most industries following WWII. By the 1970s, Fender, Vox, Marshall, and others had all released transistor-based amplifiers, with the most successful being the Roland Jazz Chorus, which became a popular alternative to the Fender Twin for clean tones.

=== 1970s–1980s: Master volume amplifiers ===
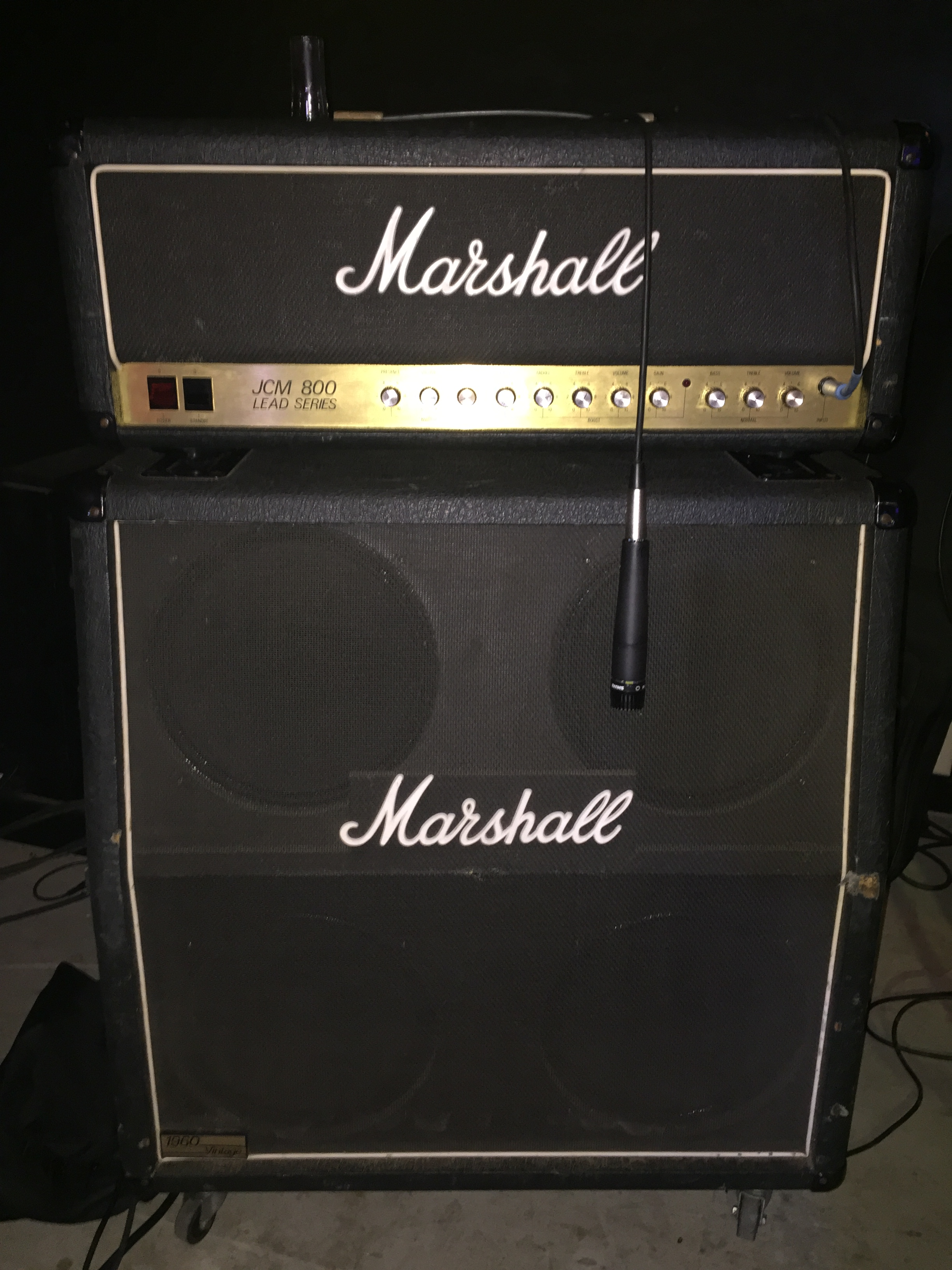
JCM 800 head and 4x12 cabinet.

As rock music evolved, so too did the need among guitarists for greater amounts of distortion. Amps like Marshall's Super Lead could produce distortion but did so by a player pushing the power section into saturation by playing it at high volume levels that were not always practical. Many players turned to effects pedals like the Maestro Fuzz-Tone and Arbiter Fuzz Face as a solution, the former notably being used by Keith Richards on the Rolling Stones' hit "(I Can't Get No) Satisfaction".

By the early 1970s, it had become popular for technicians to "hot rod" Fender amplifiers to achieve more distortion through methods like adding a "master volume" circuit, which used two volume controls, one to control how much the preamp tubes distorted and another to control overall output. One such technician was Mesa/Boogie founder Randall Smith, whose modified Fenders evolved into the brand's Mark series, which used a series of variable gain stages that "cascaded" into each other to create more distortion than any previous amplifier could. In doing so, Smith pioneered "high-gain" amps. Howard Dumble used a similar cascading gain design with his Overdrive Special, which gave players a foot-switchable "lead" mode with extra gain stages.

While early Mesas and Dumbles were popular among guitarists like Carlos Santana, the heavier guitar tones of Black Sabbath's Tony Iommi using a Laney Supergroup amplifier and a modified Dallas Rangemaster treble booster inspired players in the growing heavy metal genre to pursue more aggressive tones. Marshall looked to meet this demand with the 1981 release of the JCM800 2203, which was initially a close copy of the brand's first master volume-equipped amp, the JMP 2203, released in 1975, but underwent several circuit changes in the next few years. Throughout the 1980s, Mesa/Boogie continued revising its Mark series, pioneering new features with their Mark II iterations like channel-switching and effects loops. Smith and his company's most significant revision produced the Mark IIC+ variant, which had a tighter, more aggressive tone that was popularized by Metallica. The JCM800 and Mark series marked a transition from "vintage"-style amplifiers to modern designs.

Technicians in the 1980s continued pushing modded amplifiers into higher-gain territory, and some became successful enough to launch their own companies, including Soldano, Bogner, and Rivera. Soldano's SLO-100 helped establish the high-end, high-gain amplifier market and inspired later German brands like ENGL, Hughes & Kettner, and Diezel. Toward the end of the decade, many professional guitarists adopted complex rackmount setups, often consisting of multiple preamps, power amps, and studio-grade effects, all operated with a custom pedal controller. Popular rackmount preamps included the A/DA MP-1, Mesa/Boogie Triaxis, Marshall JMP-1, and Soldano X88-R.

=== 1990s–present: Boutique brands and digital modeling ===
While rackmount setups were widely used by pros, they were expensive, and by the time affordable rackmount options came to the market in the early 1990s grunge had inspired a return to standalone amplifiers, vintage-style effects pedals, and a less processed sound. The 1990s also experienced a new wave of boutique amplifier builders. The old Fender and Marshall amps previous techs had modded were by then too valuable to alter, so many instead founded companies that built new amps inspired by vintage designs. A notable example was Matchless and their Vox AC30-inspired DC-30 combo. Other companies continued to push the boundaries of high-gain, with Mesa/Boogie's Dual Rectifier becoming the decade's quintessential high-gain amplifier. Peavey's 5150, co-designed with Eddie Van Halen, became another frequently-used amplifier among metal guitarists.

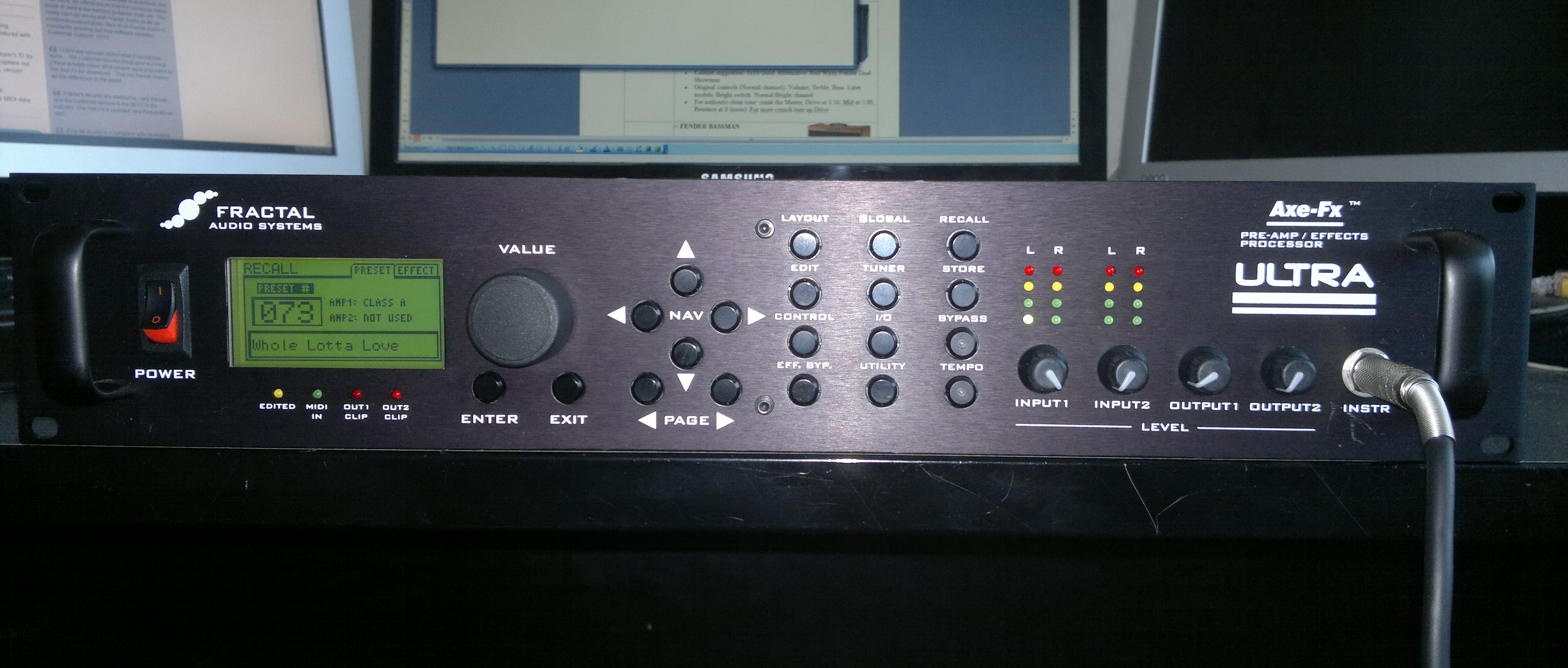
An Axe-FX Ultra

Modeling technology advanced significantly during this time. Tech 21 had released its analog SansAmp amplifier modeler in 1989 but it became popular in the 1990s as a direct recording solution. Line 6 released its first digital modeling amplifier, the AxSys, in 1996, followed by the bean-shaped desktop POD processor two years later. Early modelers were regarded as home practice tools until the 2006 arrival of Fractal Audio's Axe-FX, the first modeler considered sufficient for professional use. The Kemper Profiler followed in 2011, pioneering "profiling", also known as "capturing", a technology that allows users to create and use digital versions of their own physical gear. The success of digital modeling in an otherwise analog landscape has led to a long-running debate over the merits of tube amplifiers compared to modelers. Tube amp players often appreciate the nostalgia of the technology and argue analog amps and cabinets have a "soul" that cannot be replicated; modeler users value their portability, consistency, and reliability.

Many tube amp manufacturers have responded by implementing digital technology into their products, especially impulse responses (IRs), which are digital emulations of speaker cabinets and microphones. IRs allow for easier home recording, letting players skip the use of physical cabinet setups while still using a tube amplifier. Alongside the development of modelers, smaller "lunchbox" amplifiers—amp heads that use metal cases and a low-output power stage—have become popular following the success of the 15-watt Orange Tiny Terror, released in 2006. Boss debuted its Katana line of analog-digital hybrid amplifiers in 2016, and it became the industry's bestselling amp line.

As digital signal processing technology has progressed, modelers have become more compact and inexpensive, with budget offerings from brands like Mooer, NUX, and Joyo. Many brands now incorporate AI and machine learning into their products and design process. One such company, Neural DSP, established itself through audio plug-ins that create computer-based virtual amplifier and effects modelling suites. Neural released their first piece of hardware, the Quad Cortex, in 2020.

== Structure ==
=== Format ===
Fundamentally, guitar amplifiers function by taking the signal generated by an electric guitar's pickup(s) and feed it through an electronic circuit in which the tone is shaped and amplified before being projected through one or more loudspeakers. An amplifier in which this entire process happens inside a single enclosure is referred to as a combo. When the tone-shaping and amplification occur inside a dedicated unit that requires a separate speaker cabinet, it is known as a head. Most amplifiers utilize a tone stack that consists of controls to individually adjust bass, midrange, and treble frequency levels. Reverb is a commonly included effect. For models that use vacuum tubes, the specific tube types used and the number of them have a significant impact on the amp's tone and ability to create distortion. Many amps are designed with two or more selectable channels which allow for different volume, distortion, and equalization settings.

=== Control layout ===
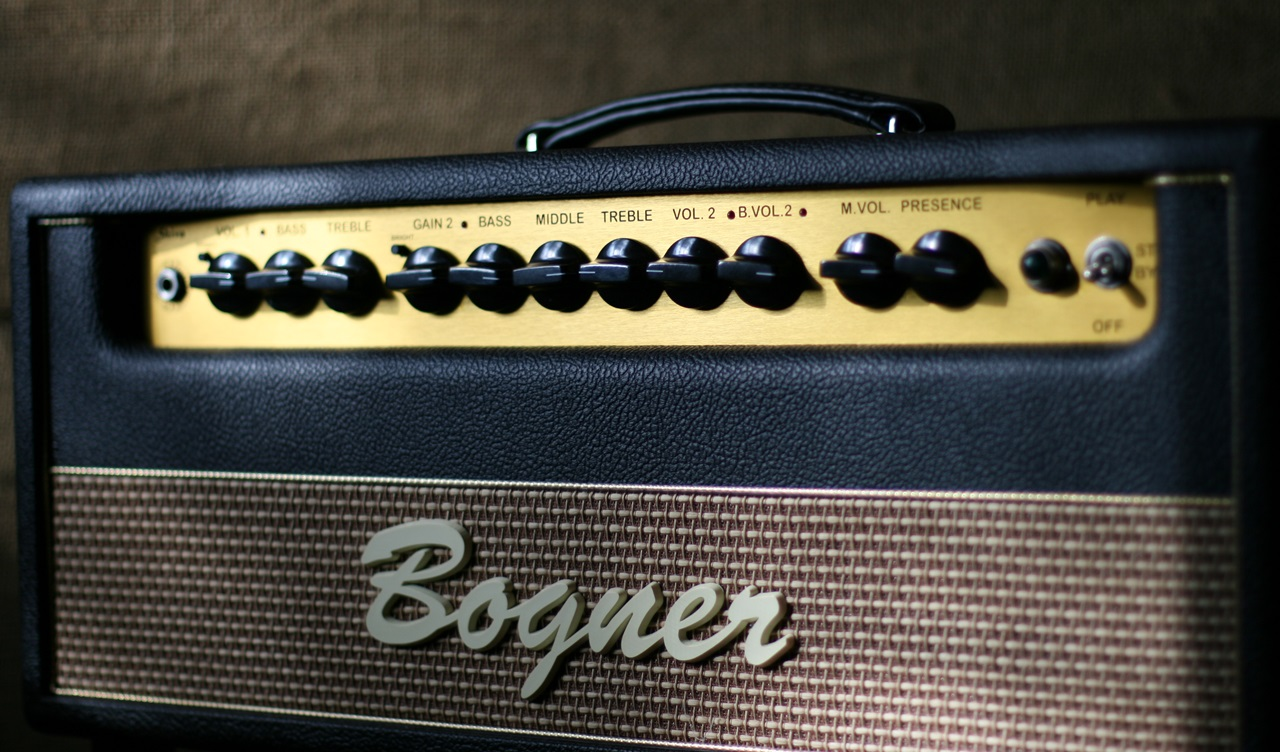
The control panel of a Bogner Shiva amp head.

Control knobs and buttons are typically located on the front of an amp's chassis. Common front panel controls include those for preamp volume or gain; bass, middle, and treble frequency adjustments; and master volume. Amps with more complex feature sets can also include presence and resonance controls or even a graphic equalizer, as in the Mesa/Boogie Mark Series. These tone controls can be "passive" or "active". Passive tone controls use parts like resistors and capacitors that do not require additional electric power and can only cut selected frequencies. Active tone controls can cut or boost frequencies but use parts like transistors and op amps that require external power to operate. Guitars are connected to the amp via one or more 1/4" jacks.

Back panel features include connections for the external speaker cabinets and optional features like an effects loop, power attenuation, headphone use, and direct recording.

=== Preamp and power amp ===
The electronic circuit of a guitar amplifier can be divided into two major sections. First, the preamp, or preamplifier, receives the relatively weak signal generated by the guitar's pickup(s) and amplifies it to line level. The preamp is also primarily responsible for the amp's tone-shaping and equalization controls. The amount of amplification applied to the incoming signal, known as gain, affects the amp's volume and preamp distortion. The power amp then receives the processed signal and amplifies it to the player's desired output level via the loudspeakers. Wattage is used as a measurement of how much power an amp can produce.

For the first several decades of their use, guitar amplifiers almost exclusively used vacuum tubes in both the preamp and power amp sections. The 12AX7 is the most common preamp tube, while power amps utilize a range of different tubes that have helped define the tonal characteristics of many notable amp brands. British brands Marshall, Hiwatt, and Orange commonly use the EL34, which has a gritty, aggressive sound with strong midrange presence and distorts easily. Vox relies on the EL84 tube, which offers less power and more compression than the bigger EL34, but with a brighter top end and less lows. Fender is heavily associated with the 6L6, which has more clean headroom and a flatter frequency response. The 6V6 is similar to the 6L6 but has less headroom. The KT66 is likewise similar to the 6L6 but features stronger midrange frequencies.

==== Power output ====
The relationship between power output in watts and perceived volume is nuanced. Generally speaking, more wattage equates to more volume, but there can be a significant difference in perceived volume depending on the nature of the power amp. Tube-based power amps, for example, will seem louder than their solid-state counterparts at a given wattage, with a 10- to 15-watt tube amp being roughly equivalent in volume to a 50-watt solid-state amp. Among tube amps, however, there is not a significant difference in maximum volume based on wattage. As measured in dBs, a 100-watt tube amp is not significantly louder than a 15-watt tube amp; the major difference is instead in headroom, or how loud an amp can be set before it starts to distort, with the 100-watt amp being able to stay cleaner at much louder volumes than the 15-watt amp. For many players though, the output level setting is chosen not purely for reasons of volume, but also for the perception that tube amps often sound their best at specific volume settings that strike a balance between driving the preamp and power amp while preserving the dynamics of a guitarist's playing.

==== Distortion ====
Distortion (or "overdrive") is an important characteristic of most guitar amplifiers. Distortion can be produced in either the preamp or power amp, or both. Early amplifiers like the 100-watt Marshall Super Lead used a single volume control to control the amp's overall output volume. Distortion was produced by increasing that volume control to overload the amp's power amp tubes, which often required extremely high volumes—the more volume, the more distortion. Generally, distortion is more associated with tube amps, which have less headroom than solid-state amps and are considered to have a more pleasing overdriven character.

Most modern amplifiers use two volume controls: an initial volume control (often labeled "preamp" or "gain") that affects the level of the input signal and then a master volume control placed at the end of the circuit (after the power amp tubes), allowing for level attenuation before the signal is sent to the loudspeakers. A master volume allows distortion to be produced by pushing the preamp and/or power amp into distortion before the output level is then set to the player's desired overall volume. Conversely, amps like the Soldano SLO-100 produce distortion solely in its preamp, allowing for significant levels of distortion at any volume. Preamp gain is often preferred for its added compression and harmonic overtones.

===== High-gain =====
Amplifiers designed to produce heavy amounts of distortion for genres like hard rock and metal are often referred to as high-gain. Early amps like the Super Lead could produce distortion and saturation but proved unsatisfactory as much of rock music became more aggressive into the 1980s and beyond. Master volumes were an important factor in the development of high-gain tones, as was Mesa/Boogie's pioneering of "cascading" preamp designs, in which multiple gain stages arranged in series would spill over one into the next as the preamp/gain control is increased, allowing for unprecedented amounts of distortion. High-gain abilities are now considered a definitive quality of modern amplifiers.

===== In popular culture =====
The original "up to eleven" knobs in the 1984 film This Is Spinal Tap

Volume control gradations are typically numbered from zero to ten. In the 1984 film This Is Spinal Tap, guitarist Nigel Tufnel demonstrates an amplifier with volume knobs marked from zero to eleven, believing that this numbering increases the highest volume of the amp. He explains, "It's one louder, isn't it?" This misunderstanding of the underlying operating principles led to the idiom "Up to eleven", also phrased as "These go to eleven". As a consequence of the film, real bands and musicians started buying equipment whose knobs went up to eleven or twelve.

=== Power supply ===
While amplifiers need direct current to operate, wall power comes from the socket as alternating current. Essentially, AC flows forward and backward, but DC flows in only one direction, and an amp's power supply needs to correct for this. Because simple, two-element vacuum tube diodes only allow current to flow one way, they can be used to convert AC to DC. A diode is known as a "rectifier" when used in this way. Solid-state rectifiers have replaced tube rectifiers in most contemporary amps because of their increased reliability, but many guitarists prefer the tone of tube rectifiers. Some amps, like the Mesa/Boogie Dual Rectifier, allow players to select between rectification methods.

An amp's rectifier works in tandem with other components of the power supply, such as a transformer, which regulates the voltage coming from the wall power for use in the amp. A transformer is primarily made of iron laminations and copper windings, and it is often the heaviest component of a tube amp. Because solid-state amps do not require a transformer, they are much lighter in weight.

=== Cabinet design ===
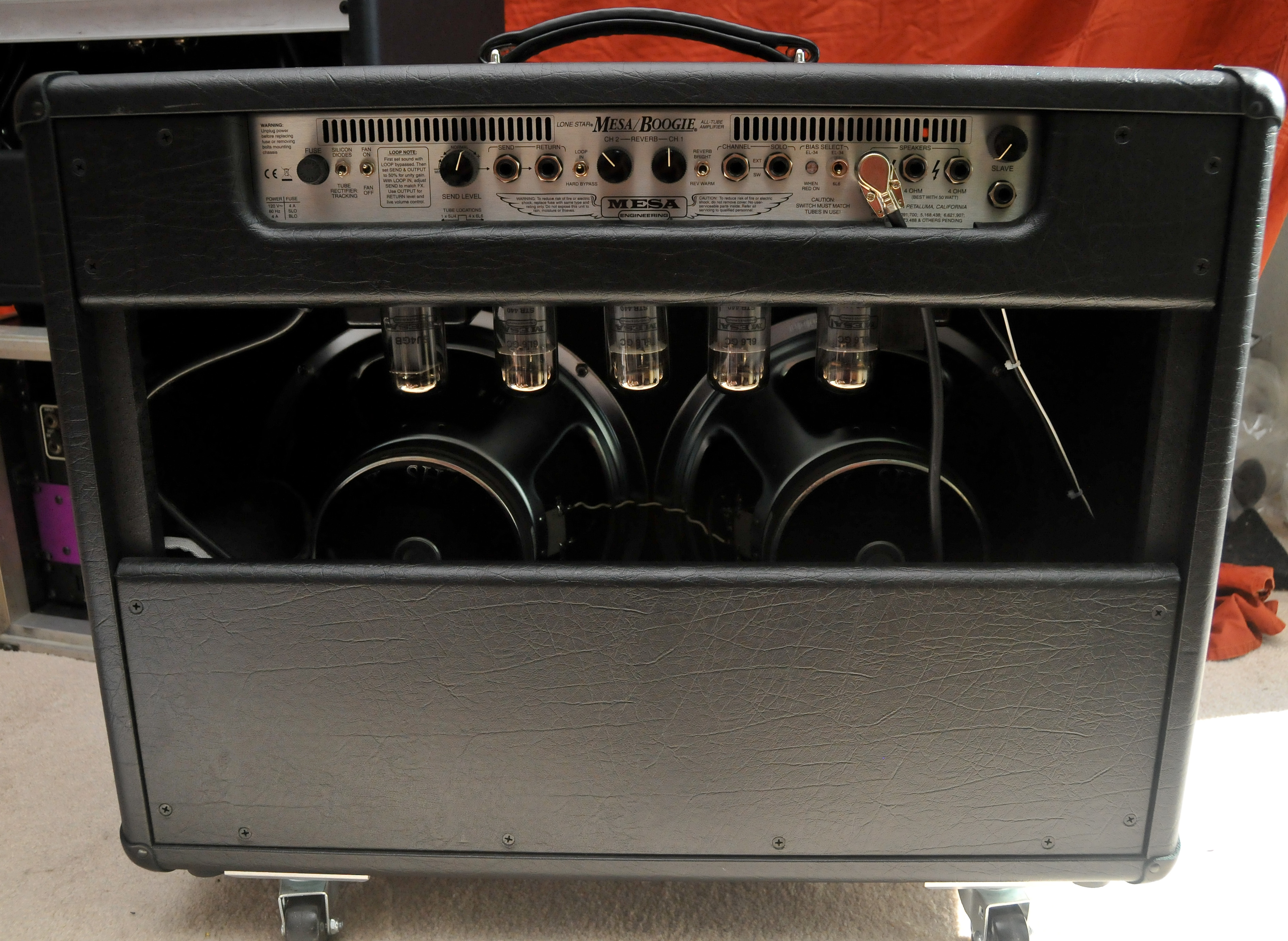
Back view of a Mesa/Boogie Lone Star combo partially showing its pair of 12" speakers.

Combos and external speaker cabinets required for use with heads come in a variety of configurations. Combos often use one or two 12" speakers, or between one and four 10" speakers. Smaller practice amps often use even smaller speakers. Standalone cabinets paired with heads typically use up to four 10" or 12" speakers.

Several different designs can used, including an "open back" design, a "closed back" design (essentially a sealed box), and the less-common bass reflex design, which uses a closed back with a vent or port cut into the cabinet. With guitar amps, most open back amp cabinets are not fully open; part of the back is instead enclosed with panels. Combo amp cabinets and standalone speaker cabinets are typically made of plywood. Some are made of MDF or particle board—especially in low-budget models. Cabinet size and depth, material types, assembly methods, type and thickness of the baffle material (the wood panel that holds the speaker), and the way the baffle attaches to the cabinet all affect tone.

When two or more speakers are used in the same cabinet, or when two cabinets are used together, the speakers can be wired in parallel or in series, or in a combination of the two (e.g., two 2x10" cabinets, with the two speakers wired in series, can be connected together in parallel). Whether speakers are wired in parallel or in series affects the impedance of the system. Two 8 ohm speakers wired in parallel have 4-ohm impedance. Guitarists who connect multiple cabinets to an amplifier must consider the amp's minimum impedance. Parallel vs. series also affects tone and sound. Speakers wired in parallel slightly dampen[s] and restrain[s] them, giving what some describe as tighter response and smoother breakup. Some describe speakers wired in series (usually no more than two) as sounding "...looser, giving a slightly more raw, open and edgy sound."

==== Stacks ====
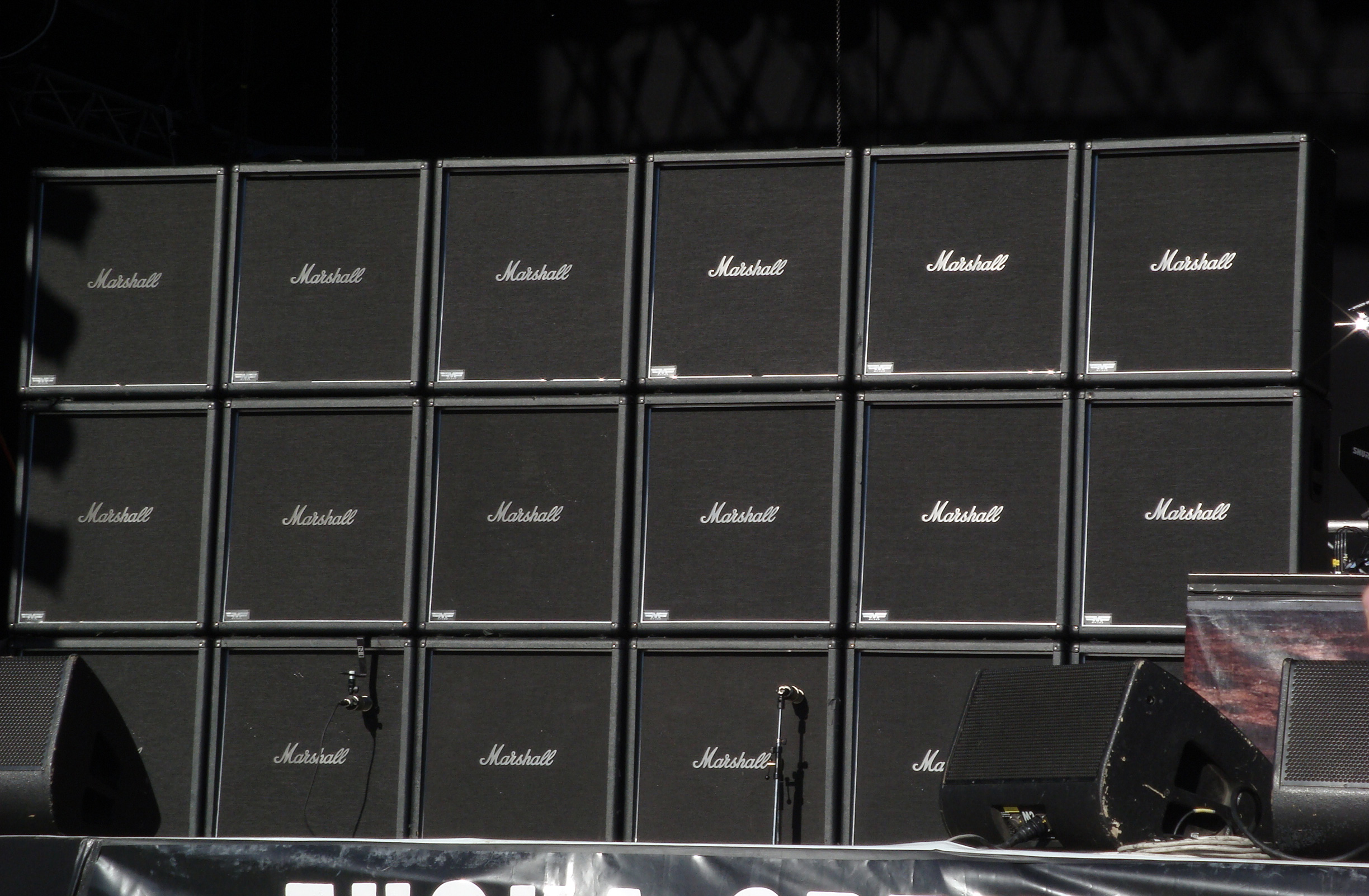
A 3 × 6 stack of mock Marshall guitar cabinets for Jeff Hanneman of Slayer.

When an amp head is placed atop a speaker cabinet, it is sometimes referred to as a stack. A head placed atop a single speaker enclosure is called a half stack; when two speaker cabinets are used, it is known as a full stack. In the case of full stacks, the upper cabinet often uses a partially angled front, while the lower cabinet uses a straight front.

Stacks were popularized by Marshall in the 1960s. The brand initially paired their amp heads with a single cabinet consisting of eight 12" speakers, but these were unwieldy and quickly replaced with two cabinets, each using four 12" speakers and placed—or stacked—on top of each other.

Some touring metal and rock bands have used large arrays of guitar speaker cabinets to create an impressive appearance. Some of these arrangements include only the fronts of speaker cabinets mounted on a large frame.

== Types ==
=== Vacuum tube ===
The interior of a Fender Pro Reverb.

The tubes of a Fender Bandmaster Reverb. Note the smaller preamp tubes on the left and two larger power amp tubes with a rectifier tube on the right.

For the first several decades after their release, amps equipped with vacuum tubes (or valves in British English) were the only way of amplifying the signal from an electric guitar. A vacuum tube is a small glass cylinder containing various components within a vacuum. When an electrical current flows through the tube, a filament generates heat, which causes a cathode to release negatively charged electrons that flow to a positively charged plate that surrounds the cathode, called an anode. Between the cathode and anode is a control grid, which receives the input signal from the guitar. Adjusting the amp's controls dictates the flow of electrons: the more electrons flowing into the control grid, the greater the signal's amplification.

As a tube works harder, it produces even-order harmonics, which are generally perceived as musical and pleasing. As the volume or gain is increased, it produces harmonic distortion. The "natural warmth" and "crunch" of tubes being pushed hard is a large part of their desirability for guitarists, especially among rock and blues players. Tubes also create a natural form of compression when the signal flow is increased, which changes how notes sound depending on one's picking technique. Notes compress and distort harder when picking more aggressively, while a lighter touch produces a cleaner, more "open" sound. This enables tube amp players to play more expressively, with greater dynamics.

In conventional tube amps (as opposed to hybrid amps), tubes are used in both the preamp and power amp sections. Early amp models also used tubes for power supply rectification. What tubes an amp uses—especially in the power amp—helps dictate the tone of the amp and at what volume it starts producing distortion. For early high-wattage amps before master volumes became common, achieving heavy distortion required very high volume, as these amps were intended to be played loud enough to fill large venues before the popularization of PA systems. For smaller venues, such volumes can be impractical, and to that end many modern tube amps give users the ability to bypass one or more power amp tubes to reduce the overall output.

=== Solid-state ===
A solid-state Roland Jazz Chorus 120

Solid-state amplifiers, which were first developed in the 1960s, replace vacuum tubes with transistors. Because solid-state amps therefore do not contain fragile glass tubes and the heavy transformers they necessitate, they are cheaper to produce, more reliable, and lighter. They also remain clean at louder volumes and lack the compression characteristic of tube amps. These cleaner tones at high volume can appeal to some players, especially jazz guitarists, but compared to the warmth of tube amps, solid-state amps can be perceived as "tinny or harsh." Solid-state amps also tend to feature a wider variety of effects: while tube amps often have reverb and sometimes tremolo, solid-state amps can include modulation, delay, and octave effects as well.

Only a few solid-state amps have achieved enduring popularity, such as the Roland Jazz Chorus.

=== Hybrid ===
A hybrid amplifier involves one of two combinations of tube and solid-state amplification. It may have a tube power amp fed by a solid-state pre-amp circuit, as in most of the original MusicMan amplifiers.

Alternatively, a tube preamplifier can feed a solid-state output stage, as in models from Kustom, Hartke, SWR, and Vox. This approach dispenses with the need for an output transformer and easily achieves modern power levels.

=== Acoustic ===
A Genz-Benz Shenandoah JR acoustic amplifier

Acoustic amplifiers are intended for acoustic guitars and other acoustic instruments, especially for the way these instruments are used in relatively quiet genres such as folk and bluegrass. They are similar to keyboard amplifiers, in that they have a relatively flat frequency response with minimal coloration. To produce this relatively clean sound, these amplifiers often have powerful amplifiers (providing up to 800 watts RMS), to provide additional headroom and prevent unwanted distortion. Since an 800-watt amplifier built with standard Class AB technology is heavy, some acoustic amplifier manufacturers use lightweight Class D amplifiers, which are also called switching amplifiers.

Acoustic amplifiers produce an uncolored, acoustic sound when used with acoustic instruments with built-in transducers, pickups or microphones. The amplifiers often come with a simple mixer, so that the signals from a pickup and a condenser microphone can be blended. Since the early 2000s, it has become increasingly common for acoustic amplifiers to provide a range of digital effects, such as reverb and compression. As well, these amplifiers often contain feedback-suppressing devices, such as notch filters or parametric equalizers.

=== Modeling ===
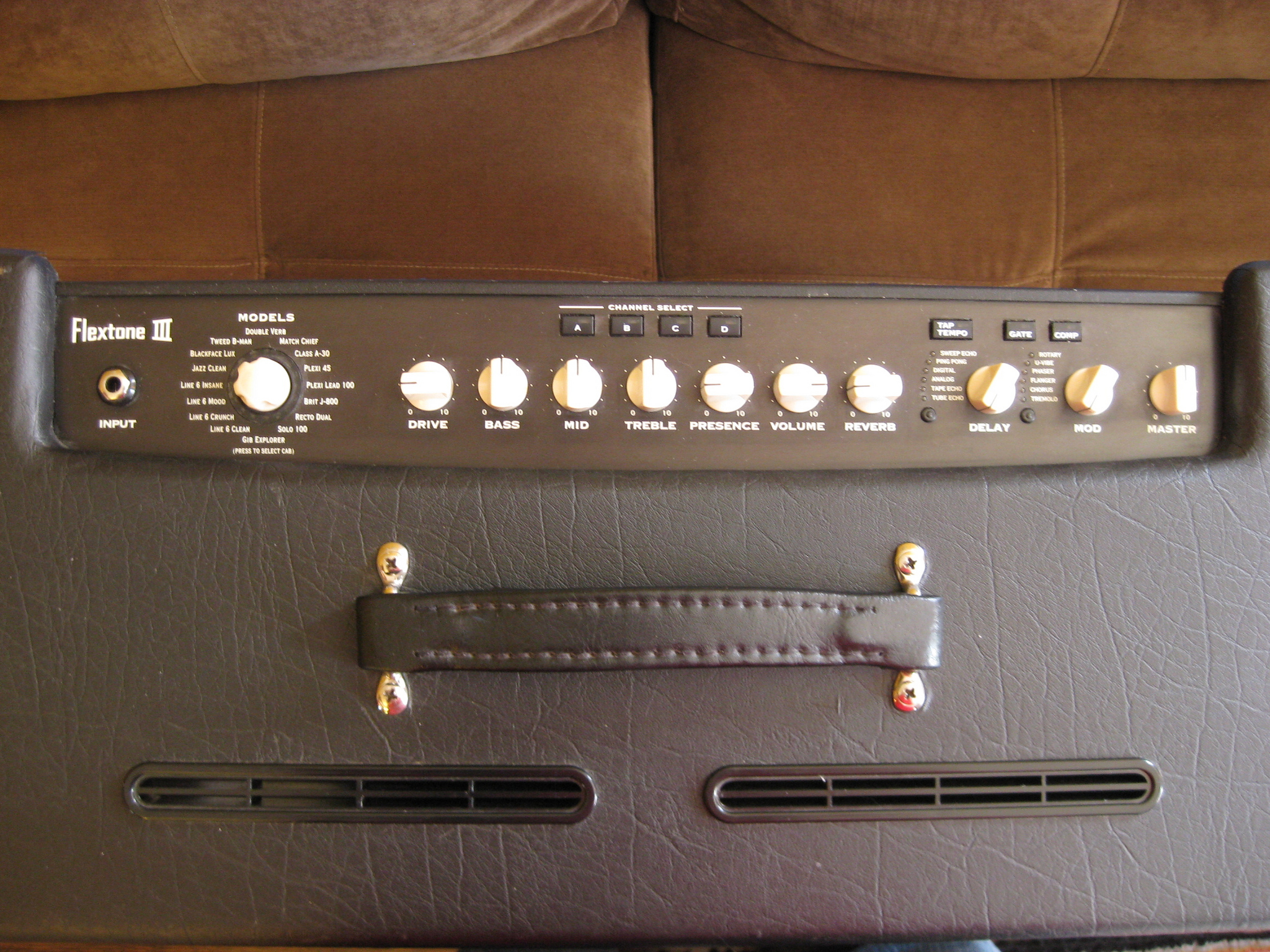
A modeling amplifier, shown from above. Note the various amplifier and speaker emulations selectable via the rotary knob on the left.

Microprocessor technology allows the use of digital onboard effects in guitar amps to create numerous different sounds and tones that simulate the sound of a range of tube amplifiers and different sized speaker cabinets, all using the same amplifier and speaker. These are known as modeling amplifiers, and can be programmed with simulated characteristic tones of different existing amplifier models (and speaker cabinets—even microphone type or placement), or dialed in to the user's taste. Many amps of this type are also programmable by way of USB connection to a home computer or laptop. Line 6 is generally credited with bringing modeling amplification to the market. Modeling amplifiers and stompbox pedals, rackmount units, and software that models specific amplifiers, speakers cabinets, and microphones can provide a large number of sounds and tones. Players can get a reasonable facsimile of the sound of tube amplifiers, vintage combo amplifiers, and huge 8x10” speaker stacks without bringing all that heavy equipment to the studio or stage.

The use of full range, flat response (FRFR) amplification systems by electric guitarists has received an extra impetus from modeling amplifiers. Before widespread availability of modeling, guitarists did not commonly plug electric guitars straight into PA systems or powered speakers because most genres relied on the tonal coloration of a regular guitar amplifier setup—from the preamplifier, equalization filters, power amp, guitar speakers, and cabinet design. The FRFR approach assumes the tone is shaped by sound processors in the signal chain before the amplifier and speaker stage, so it strives to not add further coloration or dedicated combo-style amplifiers with a broad frequency range. Such processors can be traditional guitar effects, a modeling amplifier (without power amplifier), or a computer running tone-shaping software. Using a modeling amp or a multi-effects pedal used with line level output, a guitarist can plug in the guitar into a flat response mic input or into a keyboard amplifier.

=== Pedal ===
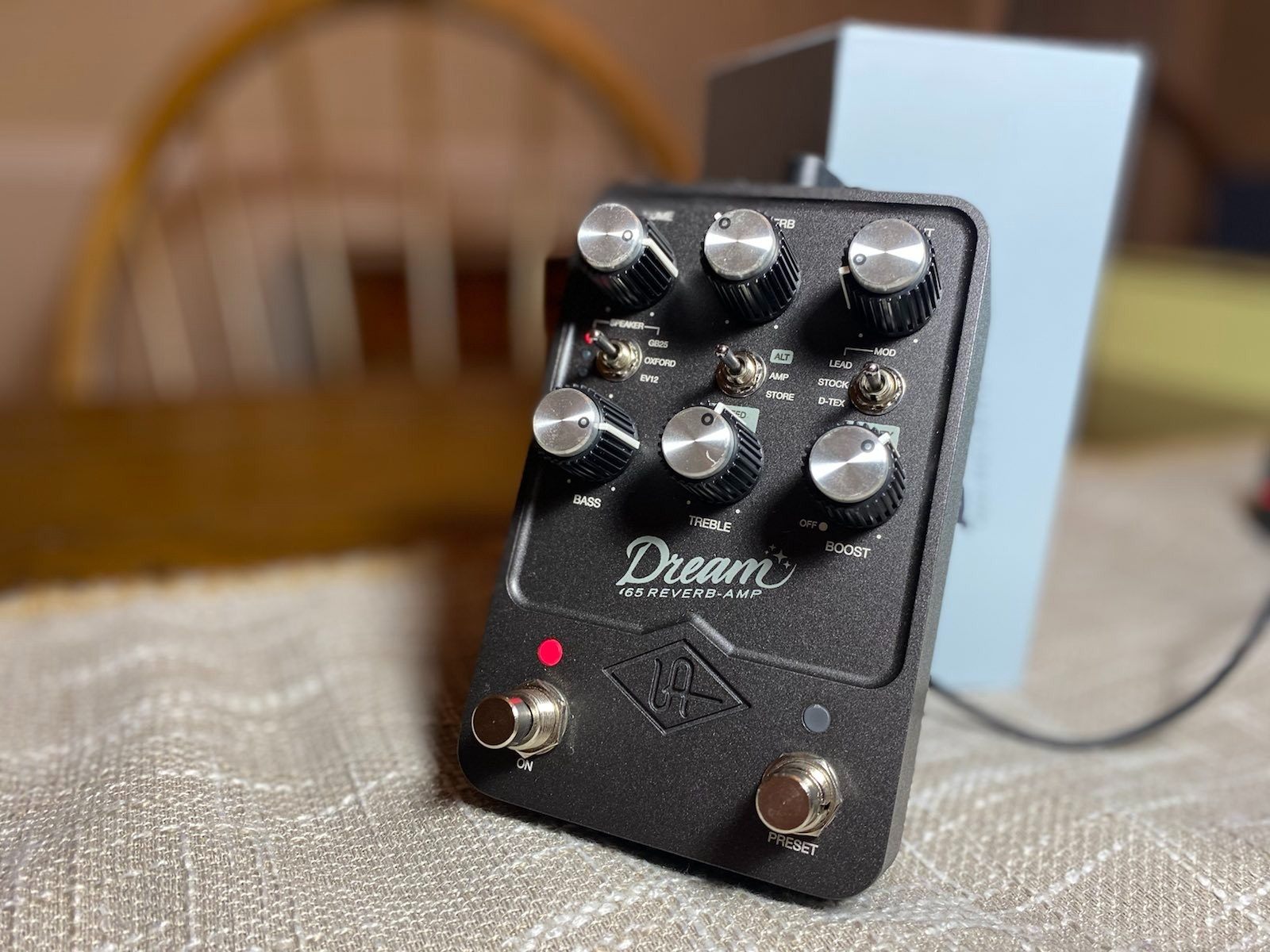
A Universal Audio Dream '65 digital modeler preamp pedal.

A pedal amplifier is a compact amplifier placed at a player's feet, often as part of—or used in tandem with—a pedalboard. Pedal amps are effectively amp heads in pedal format, containing preamp and power amp circuits but not speakers. Pedal amps became popular in the 2020s as amplification technology continued to shrink in size, since they proved ideal options for a small, portable rig or for use as an emergency backup for a conventional amplifier. Pedal amps generally use solid-state technology but some models include tube preamps in a hybrid approach. Digital modelers often come in pedal amp format, but lack power amp functionality. In such cases, preamp-only pedal amps typically include speaker emulation to mimic the sound of a full amplifier setup and send it to a powered speaker, PA system, or recording system.

== See also ==
- Vintage musical equipment
- Tube sound
- Bass amplifier
