= Mesa/Boogie Mark IIC+ =

Model of guitar amplifier

The Mesa/Boogie Mark IIC+ is a guitar amplifier produced by California-based manufacturer Mesa/Boogie as part of its Mark series. The Mark IIC+ was released in 1984 as the final update to the Mark II model and became popular for the saturated and compressed character of its "high-gain"—or heavily distorted—rhythm and lead tones. Session guitarists like Michael Landau, Dean Parks, and Steve Lukather used the Mark IIC+ on hundreds of hit songs at the time, while Prince adopted the amp beginning with his Purple Rain Tour. The amplifier is most closely associated however with metal players like Dream Theater's John Petrucci and Metallica's James Hetfield and Kirk Hammett, with Master of Puppets commonly cited as the Mark IIC+'s most famous use on a recording. Around 3,000 copies were made before it was superseded by the Mark III in 1985 after only fourteen months in production. Despite its short run, the Mark IIC+ was one of the most influential amplifiers of the 1980s in pop and rock music, alongside the Marshall JCM800. The Mark IIC+ has since become one of the industry's most sought-after vintage amp models. Mesa/Boogie reissued it in 2024.

== History ==
=== Earlier Mark models ===
With its Mark I, Mesa/Boogie pioneered high-gain amplifiers using what became known as a "cascading" gain circuit: in this case, four gain stages were wired in series and configured to "spill over" one into the next as the control panel's gain settings were increased; this allowed the preamp to be pushed into distortion regardless of how much signal was sent to the output stage. The result was a "sizzling, ultra-saturated preamp distortion" that has since become commonplace in modern guitar amps. Unlike non-master volume amps of the time, the power amp is not relied on to produce distortion in such a design.

Mesa/Boogie released the Mark II in 1978, adding a fifth gain stage as part of a new Lead mode, and several iterations followed to fix minor problems and integrate player requests. The original Mark II (or Mark IIA, as it was later known) was the first amplifier to offer mode switching, which could be performed with a provided footswitch and acted like a dual-channel design. The Mark IIB was the industry's first amp to have a buffered effects loop. The Mark IIB, however, suffered from a tendency to make a loud popping sound when switching modes and the IIC was introduced in 1983 to remedy this.

=== Mark IIC+ ===
While the popping noise was fixed, company founder Randall Smith still had concerns with the implementation of the effects loop and noisy reverb units. Around this time, Smith had hired engineer Doug West, and further development of the Mark IIC became a joint project between West and Mike Bendinelli, who had been Smith's first employee hire. The duo made multiple changes to the Mark IIC circuit: the effects loop was changed to improve the amp's sound and dynamics, and the reverb was fixed; more notably, another gain stage was added and the preamp revoiced for a more aggressive tone, more midrange focus, and tighter lows, which suited the redesign to rock solos and chord playing. Copies with these updates were indicated by a "+" sign written in magic marker on the rear of the chassis above the power cord, creating the Mark IIC+. The "+", however, was not distinguished by Mesa/Boogie at the time, with the update being treated as simply the latest IIC incarnation when it went into production in February 1984.

Smith and his team custom-built Mark IIC+s in his Lagunitas workshop using a base model dubbed the "Super Sixty." Purchasers could select from a number of optional features that included a 100-watt power amp, reverb, a graphic equalizer, hardwood cabinetry, wicker grill, and alternate speaker models on combos. The two most-requested configurations were for either 60 or 100 watt power sections, with reverb and the graphic EQ, which Mesa/Boogie indicated with "SRG" and "HRG" chassis codes during production. For several years after the IIC+'s introduction, Mesa/Boogie invited IIC owners to send in their amps and the brand would make the "+" mod for free, but they started charging fees when demand for the mod started disrupting the production of other models.

Upon its release, the Mark IIC+ quickly became popular among prominent Los Angeles-based session guitarists of the time, such as Mike Landau, Steve Lukather, and Dean Parks, who all used the amp on numerous hit records. Prince began using the IIC+ on his 1984 tour in support of Purple Rain. Other IIC+ players included John Petrucci of Dream Theater, Joe Satriani, Neal Schon of Journey, Buck Dharma of Blue Öyster Cult, and Bruce Springsteen.

Mesa/Boogie discontinued the IIC+ in March 1985 after producing around 3,000 copies over fourteen months. It was replaced by the Mark III, which had been in development since before the IIC+ was first released. Compared to the IIC+, Mark IIIs added a second Rhythm mode with more gain but used cheaper printed circuit boards and less powerful transformers. Aficionados often debate how similar (or different) certain Mark III iterations are tonally from the IIC+.

Mesa/Boogie released an official reissue in 2024.

=== Mark IIC++ ===
In 1985, Vivian Campbell of Dio asked Mesa/Boogie to modify his IIC+ for more gain and heft. The brand added another gain stage and further tightened the low end, and the result was dubbed the IIC++. While the brand never offered the mod officially, it performed it at the request of players. Mesa/Boogie later estimated it had made about 20 IIC++s, several of which ended up in the hands of James Hetfield and Kirk Hammett of Metallica. Due to the Crunch Berries sticker placed on one of the band's IIC++s, the mod is sometimes known as the Crunch Berries mod. Hammett described these amps paired with EMG pickup-equipped guitars as a crucial part of Metallica's sound beginning with 1986's Master of Puppets and said, "I don't know how much further we would have got with just Marshalls." Mesa/Boogie produced a limited reissue run of 200 IIC++ units in 2025.

== Design ==
=== Features ===
Front panel controls

Rhythm mode

- Volume 1: affects input gain and tone; tone gets darker/fatter when turned clockwise

Pull Bright: extends treble frequencies

- Treble

Pull Shift: cuts treble frequencies in Lead mode only, a change from the IIC, which affected both modes

- Bass

Pull Shift: extends bass frequencies early in signal path

- Middle
- Master 1: mode output volume

Pull Deep: extends bass frequencies later in signal path; changed from Gain Boost on IIC

Lead mode

- Lead Drive: affects gain and tone, increasing treble frequencies when turned clockwise

Pull Lead: toggles between modes

- Lead Master: mode output volume

Pull Bright: extends treble frequencies in Lead mode

The Mark IIC+ is a single-channel amplifier with two footswitchable performance modes, a lower-gain Rhythm mode and a higher-gain Lead mode. Rhythm mode consists of five controls: Volume 1 (gain), Treble, Bass, Middle, and Master 1 (volume). Lead mode triggers additional gain stages for more distortion, with controls for Lead Drive (gain) and Lead Master (volume). These volume and gain controls collectively interact to create a variety of potential gain structures. The three-band equalizer is placed pre-gain. Of the IIC+'s seven control knobs, six have push-pull functionality that shift or alter certain frequencies when activated. The optional five-band graphic equalizer is post-gain and uses a three-way toggle switch to bypass it or assign it to either both modes or just the lead mode.

The Mark IIC+ uses five 12AX7 vacuum tubes in the preamp and four 6L6 tubes in the power amp. An optional "SimulClass" feature allows the four power tubes to be run in a hybrid configuration in which two tubes are wired in Class A and the other two in Class A/B. Upon its original release, base models were 60 watts and offered as heads or combos, while a 300-watt "Coliseum" variant was also offered.

=== Tone ===
While complimenting the Mark IIC+'s cleaner tones, Guitar World noted that the amp's high-gain lead tones are its primary attraction to players. The magazine described the Mark IIC+'s lead channel as providing "smooth singing compressed high-gain solo voices and [...] gut-punching maximum gain metal rhythm tones." However, Guitar World deemed the amp's shared EQ a drawback, making it a compromise to dial in ideal settings across both channels. Guitar World also wrote that the Mark IIC+'s controls had significant range and could be problematic, especially the pre-gain bass control, which could be "very boomy and woofy" if not kept to lower settings when using the lead channel.

== Legacy ==
The Mark IIC+ was one of the 1980s' most important amps in pop and rock music, alongside Marshall's JCM800. Guitar World described the IIC+ as "the most revered amp in metal guitar tone" and said that its distortion remained the industry's "gold standard." Neural DSP released an official Mark IIC+ audio plug-in in 2023. In 2025, original Mark IIC+s were selling for as high as $15,000 on the used market, the highest prices for any Mesa/Boogie amplifier.

=== JP-2C ===
In 2016, Mesa/Boogie released its first non-limited signature model, the JP-2C, which was co-designed with longtime IIC+ user John Petrucci of Dream Theater. The JP-2C features three independent channels all based on the Mark IIC+. The first channel provides cleaner tones while channels two and three were designed for higher-gain and offer an alternate "Shred" voicing. Two graphic EQs are provided and can be assigned to any channel. Modern features on the JP-2C include MIDI control, a headphone output, and Mesa/Boogie's "CabClone" cabinet speaker-emulating DI.

== Authenticity ==
Because the primary outward difference between earlier Mark II models and the IIC+ is the presence of the hand-drawn "+" symbol, some Mark II sellers have been known to forge the "+" to fraudulently increase their amp's value on the used market. A popular test—the "loop test"—to identify a genuine IIC+ involves plugging a guitar into the "return" input of the effects loop, striking a note while in the lead channel, and changing the lead channel's volume and drive controls; if the decaying note is not affected by these changes, it is a IIC+.

== See also ==
- Mesa/Boogie Rectifier
