= Peavey 5150 =

Guitar amplifier

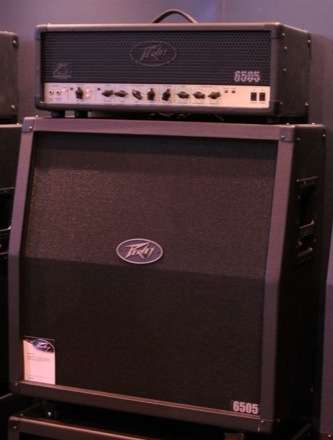
Peavey 6505 head and cab.

The Peavey 5150 is a vacuum tube based guitar amplifier made by Peavey Electronics from 1992 on. The amplifier was initially created as a signature model for Eddie Van Halen.

Counterintuitively, its name does not derive from a consecutive Peavey model number; rather, it ultimately refers to Van Halen's own 5150 Studios, which in turn are humorously named after the Lanterman–Petris–Short Act §5150, a legal code which, under certain circumstances, allows Californian authorities to confine undesirables in a mental institution temporarily.

After Van Halen and Peavey parted ways in 2004, the name was changed to Peavey 6505 in celebration of Peavey's 40th anniversary (1965–2005). The 5150 name was used again by Van Halen in partnership with Fender under the EVH brand in 2007 and 2011.

Design of the amplifier began in 1990 and it became a flagship project for Peavey and for then lead engineer James Brown (who has since founded Amptweaker), lasting for about 13 years, comprising the 5150 and 5150 II, until 2004. Peavey has since released several other versions of this amplifier.

The 5150 has been widely used in metal and is renowned for its high gain distortion and character.

== Conception ==
The 5150 was based on the Soldano SLO-100 which Eddie Van Halen was using at the time, and which was designed to provide high gain saturation as well as a clean channel.

While the product was designed around a centered printed circuit board (PCB), its cascading five preamps (actually four preamplifiers and one phase inverter) and four gain stages were implemented in a very simple manner. This design and implementation allowed the individual components to carry themselves (such as by placing the transformer so as to ensure acoustical integrity by minimizing transconductance), in addition to commonizing the system's ground by way of a multilayer PCB, thereby avoiding a large source of unwanted nuances in most poorly grounded musical applications.

Initially, the Peavey 5150 I shipped with four Sylvania 6L6 Power Tubes; this was later changed to Ruby Tube 6L6 Power Tubes, when Peavey's Sylvania supply was exhausted (per James Brown, "Tone-Talk", Ep. 17), and five 12AX7 Tubes in the preamplifier staging (with one as a phase inverter).

A defining attribute largely responsible for the 5150 sound is the fixed bias. Commonly described as an analog to a car engine and its respective idle, the 5150 bias was set to a lower value (lower engine "idle") which resulted in the Power Tubes running at a lower energy commonly known as "cold-biased." This configuration supposedly resulted in a more controllable gain setting (i.e., having a more forgiving sonic range than similarly "hot-biased" configurations).

== Use ==
Both the 5150 and the 6505 are well known for their high gain overdrive channel, and have seen widespread use by rock, hardcore and metal guitarists. An early breakthrough was its use by Colin Richardson and Andy Sneap, two "seminal" British producers of heavy metal; especially Machine Head's Burn My Eyes (1994) helped the 5150 gain a reputation for its sound, which "defined a generation of guitar tone". Other notable artists and producers to use the 5150/6505 include Jason Suecof, Matt Tuck and Dino Cazares. Dave Hunter describes the 5150 lead channel as having "a harmonic bloom and juicy harmonic saturation".

Used in conjunction with an overdrive pedal (such as the Tube Screamer) to tighten the low end, the 5150 has been widely used in metal music. The 5150 has gained popularity with extended range guitars (7-, 8- or 9-string guitars) because it retains clarity even with low tunings.

== Versions ==
Although some players believe that the 5150 (particularly the "block letter 5150") to be better-sounding than the 6505, the only difference is that the original 5150s shipped with a different brand of power tubes. Since vacuum tubes are consumable items, it is likely that the original power tubes fitted at the point of manufacture have since been replaced. It has also been rumored that the bias potentiometer on the 6505 does not sweep wide enough to provide optimal plate amperage to provide the full 35 milliamp 6L6GC plate current, thereby increasing crossover distortion.

=== 5150 / 6505 ===
The 6505 is the base model of the series. It is identical to the 5150, except for its name and the brand of tubes used. It has five 12AX7 tubes in the preamplifier. The power amplifier uses four 6L6GC tubes in the power section in class AB. It has 120 watts RMS output power, into 16, 8 or 4 Ohms. The effects loop can be bypassed with a footswitch. It features separate inputs for both high and low gain.

The amplifier has two channels, rhythm and lead. Each channel provides the user with separate pre-/postgain control, and the rhythm has an extra crunch and bright switch. The channels share a 3-Band EQ and presence and resonance controls. Switching channels can be done both via the front panel of the amp, or with the remote footswitch.

It is also available in a 60 watt 2×12 combo. The 2×12 combo features 60 watts of RMS output power into 16 or 8ohms. It also features five 12AX7 preamps tubes and two 6L6GC power amp tubes. This combo also comes with a built in spring reverb unit that the head model does not have, controllable via the footswitch and indicated by a green LED when active. (Pg 3, button #9 in the manual)

=== 5150II / 6505 Plus ===
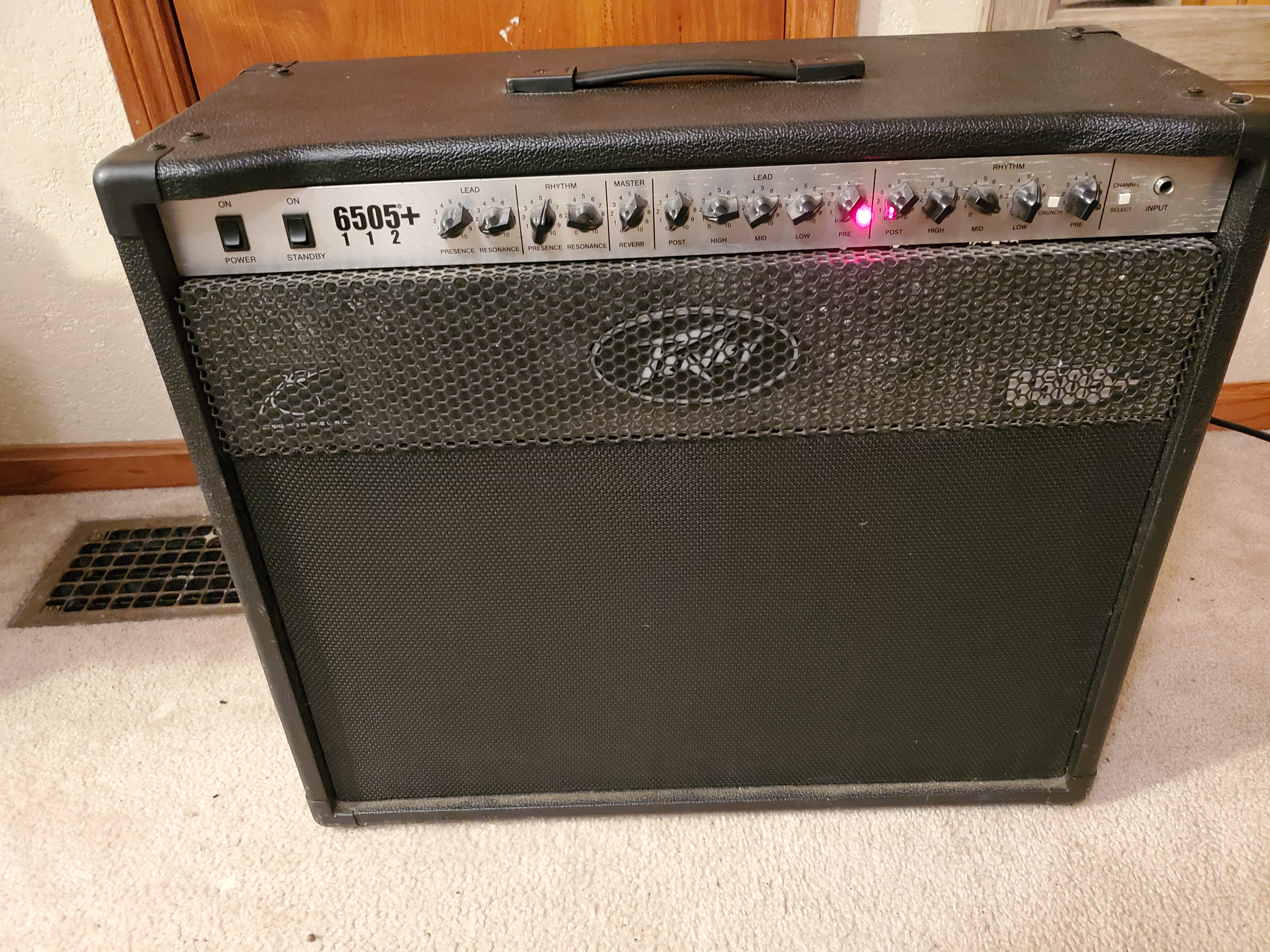
Peavey 6505+112 combo.

The 6505+ is a second version of the 6505 and is identical to the 5150II. It features an extra 12AX7 tube in the preampstage, to prevent breakup in the clean channel. It features separate 3-band EQ, presence and resonance controls for the 2 channels. It also features only one input, unlike the 6505, which had two. There are bias testpoints on the back, making changes to the tubes easier.

It is available in a 60 watt 1x12 combo (Called 6505+112), of which the internal circuitry is similar to the head, but with 5 tubes in the preamplifier, using 2 instead of 4 6L6GC powertubes an additional 3-spring reverb. It is made in China to cut costs.

=== 6534+ Plus ===
This version is identical to the 6505+, but uses EL34 tubes instead of 6L6GC tubes in the power section. It was created as a response to the growing demand of high-gain EL34 amplifiers, previously found almost solely in Marshall and ENGL amplifiers, both European brands.

=== 6505 II ===
This version comes with a new output transformer, which corrects some of the variation in midrange response. It also adds separate EQ, Resonance, and Presence controls to each channel.
