= Marshall JCM800 =

Line of guitar amplifiers made by Marshall Amplification

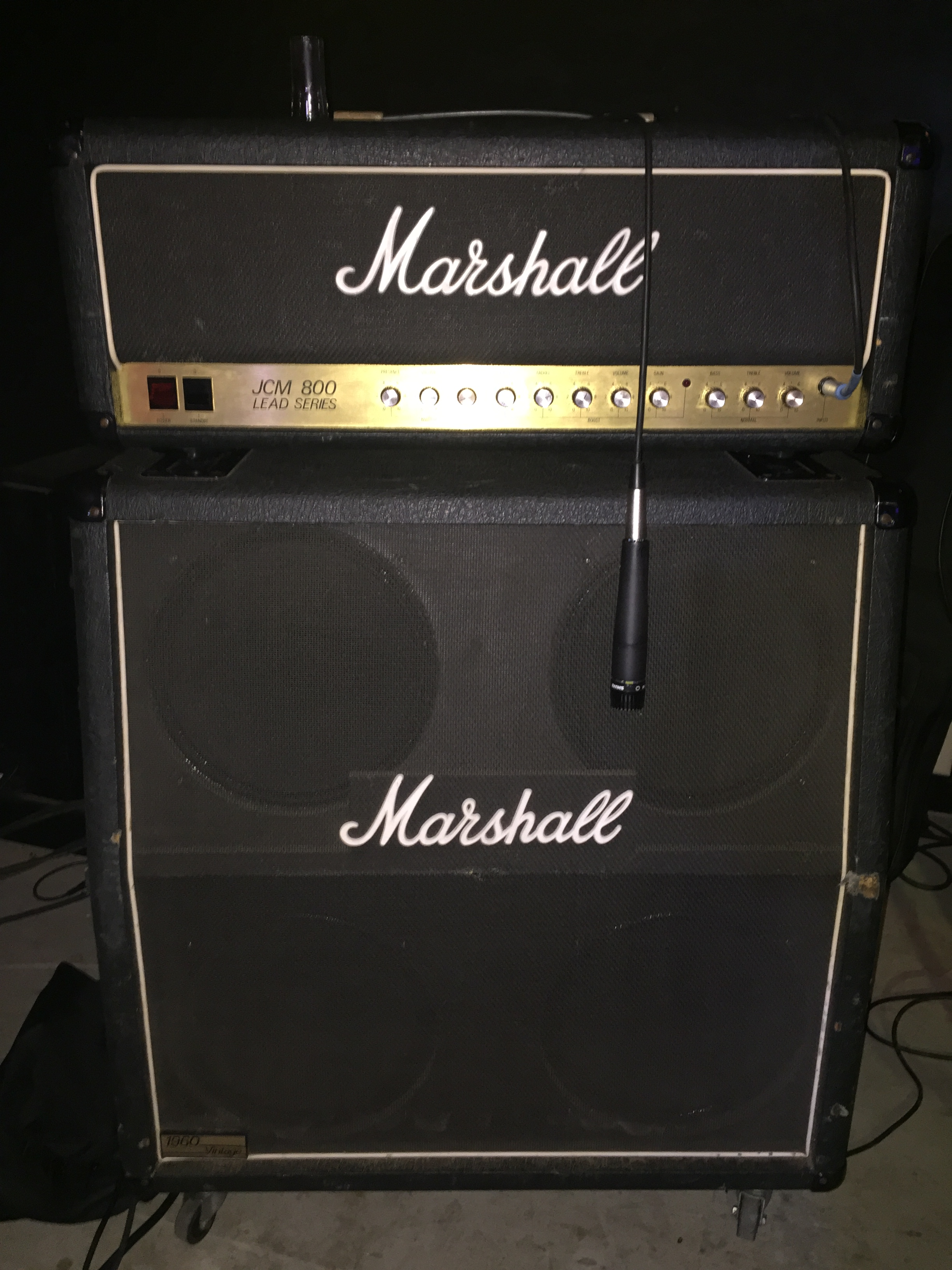
A Marshall JCM800 and 4x12 speaker cabinet

The JCM800 Series is a line of guitar amplifiers made by Marshall Amplification. The series was introduced in 1981 with the 100-watt, master volume-equipped model 2203 head and eventually grew to encompass 15 models, including 50- and 100-watt heads and combos and a bass variant. In common usage, JCM800 usually refers to model 2203, which was produced until 1990 and became a staple among hard rock and heavy metal players. It was reissued in 2002.

== History ==
While Marshall had achieved success with amplifiers like the JTM45 and Super Lead, which had become the preferred amplifiers of numerous famous guitarists, Marshall's ability to offer reasonably-priced amps abroad was hamstrung by the company's distributor Rose-Morris adding a 55% price increase to exported models. Jim Marshall was eager to launch a new product line when his distribution deal with Rose-Morris expired in 1981, and he chose to first rebrand one of the company's existing amplifiers, the 100-watt, "Master Volume" series JMP 2203. While the internal circuitry remained the same, the JMP 2203 was given a cosmetic makeover: black vinyl replaced the grill cloth, white piping was added, the control panel stretched the width of the chassis, and the Marshall logo was enlarged. This makeover served to render the existing stock of JMPs Rose-Morris still had in warehouses obsolete.

Jim Marshall was at first unsure what to call this new amp, rejecting all the initial suggestions as "dreadful," before deciding to use his car's license plate number, "JCM800." "JCM" stood for Marshall's own initials—James Charles Marshall—while "800" on the other hand was meaningless but coincided with the new decade of the 1980s.

The initial JCM800 offering, model 2203, was an immediate hit, as novice players could now afford Marshall amps similar to what many professional guitarists were using. Not everyone was initially impressed, however, as some players felt the new JCM800s sounded "flat." This proved less to do with the amps than with Marshall's new cabinets loaded with Celestion G12-M70 speakers. Marshall acknowledged the criticism and updated the cabinets with G12-M75 speakers to solve the problem.

Standard JCM800s were equipped with EL34 power tubes, but this was changed to 6550 tubes on exports to the United States due to concerns from Marshall's U.S. distributor over reliability and meeting UL standards. Using 6550s resulted in a bigger, more aggressive character. Marshall introduced several design changes over the next few years. In 1984, a 1/4" DI output was added to allow multiple heads to be connected, and the vertical configuration of the two low- and high-sensitivity inputs was changed to horizontal. A filter cap was removed in 1985, going from six to five, and another two were removed in 1986 as a cost-cutting measure. Marshall switched to EL34 tubes on U.S. exports in 1986. The JCM800 2203 and the 50-watt 2204 variant were the last of Marshall's "simple circuit" amplifier models before the company began producing more complicated designs that included features like channel-switching and effects loops. One such "split-channel" model, model 2210, provided players with reverb and more gain than its predecessors and finished the JCM800 era as Marshall's bestselling amplifier.

In 1990, the JCM800 series was discontinued in favor of the JCM900 series, which Marshall had designed to offer more gain in response to many JCM800 owners having their amps modded when brought in for other repairs. Compared to JCM800s, JCM900s were brighter and had less low end and midrange "growl".

== Description ==
The JCM800 series were the second series of Marshalls equipped with a master volume, which allowed for more distortion at lower volumes. Compared to the earlier "Master Volume" series, they offered some advantages, including the possibility to be patched internally and linked with other amplifiers. The first JCM800s were in fact Master Volume amplifiers (Models 2203 and 2204, at 100 and 50 watts respectively), repackaged in new boxes with new panels. Soon, however, the Model 2205 and 2210 appeared on the market. These were equipped with two channels, which could be activated via a footswitch, allowing for separate lead and rhythm sounds. They also had an effects loop and reverb, also a first for Marshall.

== Photo gallery ==
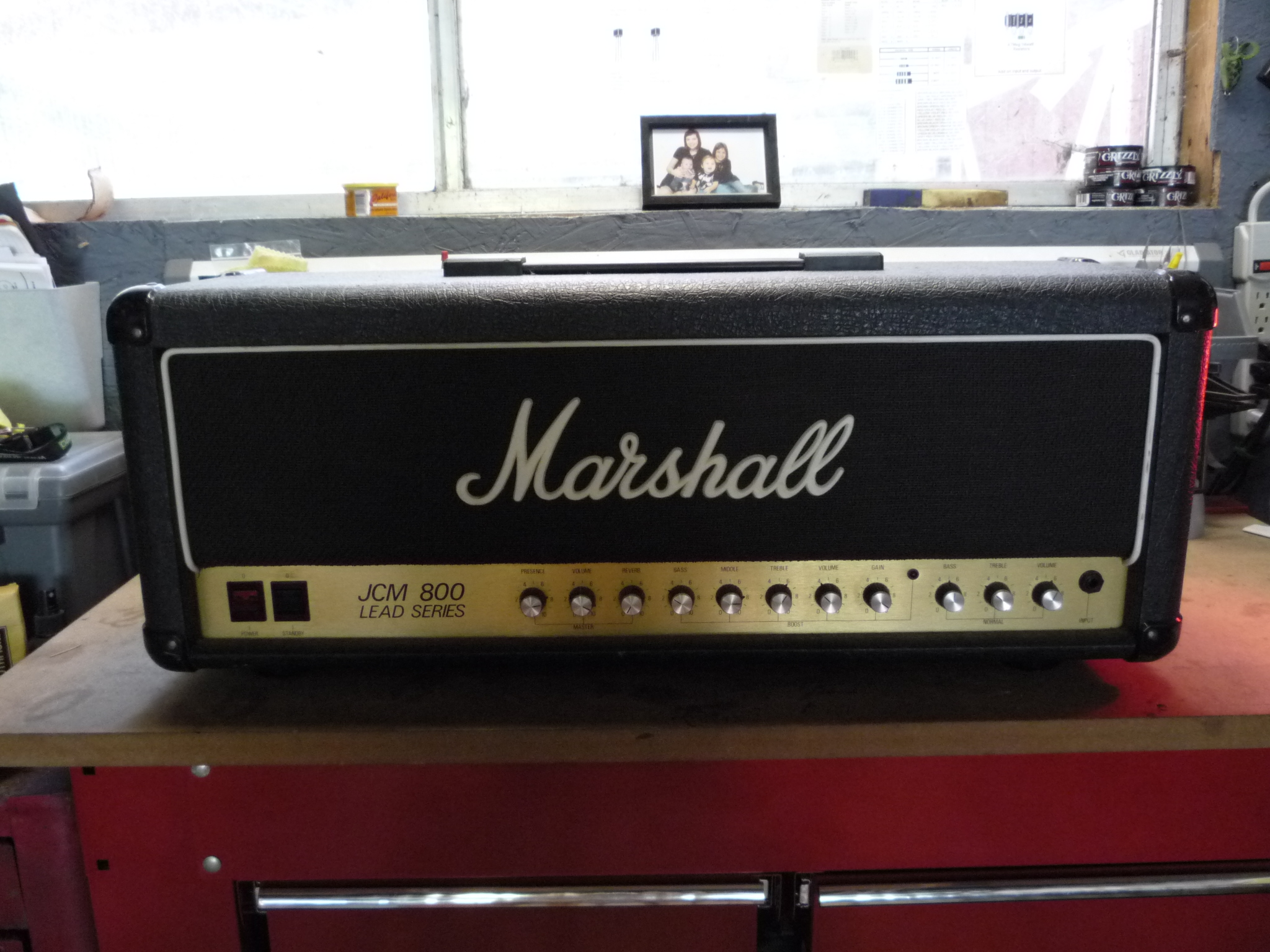
JCM 800 2205 front panel.

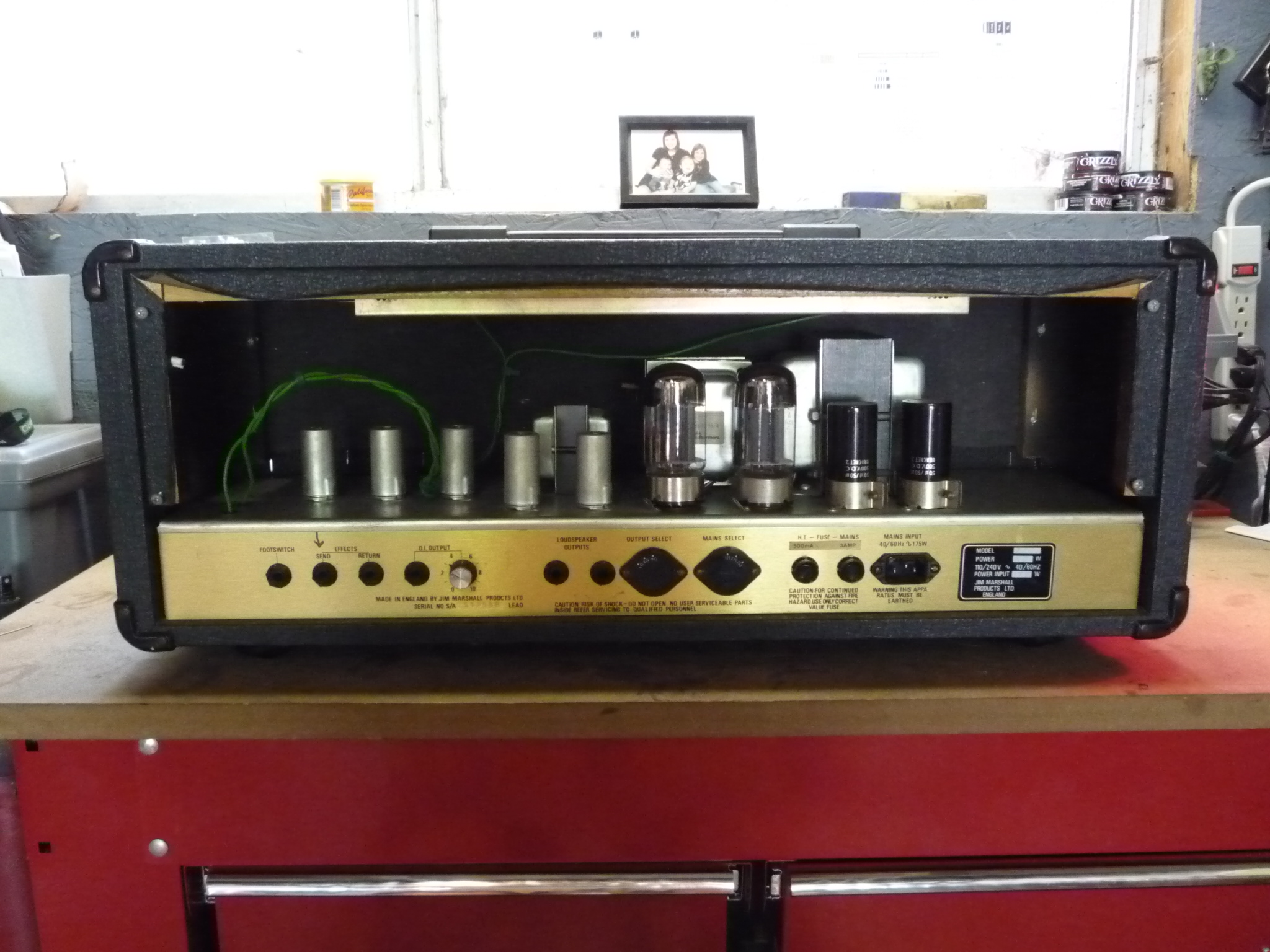
JCM 800 2205 rear panel.

== See also ==
- Mesa/Boogie Mark IIC+, another amp popular among hard rock and metal players in the 1980s
