= List of Mesa/Boogie users =

This is a list of musicians who have made notable use of Mesa/Boogie amplifiers in live performances or studio recordings.

== Mesa/Boogie users ==
- Bad Religion
- Rob Barrett of Cannibal Corpse
- Blink 182
- Buckethead
- Lindsey Buckingham of Fleetwood Mac
- Cliff Burton of Metallica
- Bush
- Les Claypool of Primus
- Kurt Cobain of Nirvana
- Chris Cornell of Soundgarden
- Brad Delson of Linkin Park
- Mike Derks of Gwar
- Buck Dharma of Blue Öyster Cult
- Al Di Meola
- Dr. Know of Bad Brains
- Mike Einziger of Incubus
- Jerry Garcia of the Grateful Dead
- Dave Grohl of Foo Fighters
- Kirk Hammett of Metallica
- James Hetfield of Metallica
- Adam Jones of Tool
- Mick Jones of the Clash
- Richard Kruspe of Rammstein
- Lamb of God
- Alex Lifeson of Rush
- Steve Lukather of Toto
- Johnny Marr of The Smiths
- Mick Mars of Mötley Crüe
- Paul McCartney
- Munky of Korn
- Bradley Nowell of Sublime
- Gary Numan
- Ed O'Brien of Radiohead
- The Offspring
- John Petrucci of Dream Theater
- Prince
- Vernon Reid of Living Colour
- Keith Richards of The Rolling Stones
- Todd Rundgren
- Carlos Santana of Santana
- Joe Satriani
- Neal Schon of Journey
- Bruce Springsteen
- John Sykes
- Kim Thayil of Soundgarden
- Mark Tremonti of Creed
- Kanami Tōno of Band-Maid
- Dean Ween of Ween
- Brian Welch of Korn
- Ronnie Wood of The Rolling Stones
- Frank Zappa
