= Effects loop =

Series of audio effects units

An effects loop is a series of audio effects units, connected between two points of a signal path (the route that a signal would travel from the input to the output); usually between the pre-amp and power amp stages of an amplifier circuit, although occasionally between two pre-amp stages. The two principal uses of effects loops are in recordings and in instrument amplifiers.

There are two main advantages of an effects loop. The first is that generally effects sound clearer and are more pronounced when the input signal is sent through a preamplifier prior to being affected. In addition to this, the tone of a guitar amplifier is generally more defined if the guitar is going direct into the input of the preamplifier. The second advantage is to match impedances of equipment. For example, most guitar rack equipment works better at line-level, and not instrument level. By placing the effects after the preamp, signal loss due to impedance mismatch is avoided.

Most guitarists use floor pedal effects between the guitar and the amplifier, or they use rack effects through the amplifier effects loop. Some amplifier manufacturers have been including a level/gain control with the effects loops to allow for the use of floor pedals through the effects loop, rather than in-line between the guitar and amplifier. This allows for more tonal control of the amplifier.

== See also ==
- Effects unit
- Audio amplifier
- Guitar
