= Marshall Amplification =

British music equipment company

Marshall Amplification PLC
- Type: Private
- Industry: Amplification, musical instrument manufacturing
- Founded: London, England (1962; 64 years ago)
- Founder: Jim Marshall
- Headquarters: Milton Keynes, England; Stockholm, Sweden
- Area served: United Kingdom, Canada, Australia, Europe, Asia, United States
- Owner: Marshall family (1962–2023); The Marshall Group AB (2023–2025); HongShan Capital Group (Marshall HoldCo (UK) Ltd; 2025–present)
- Website: marshall.com

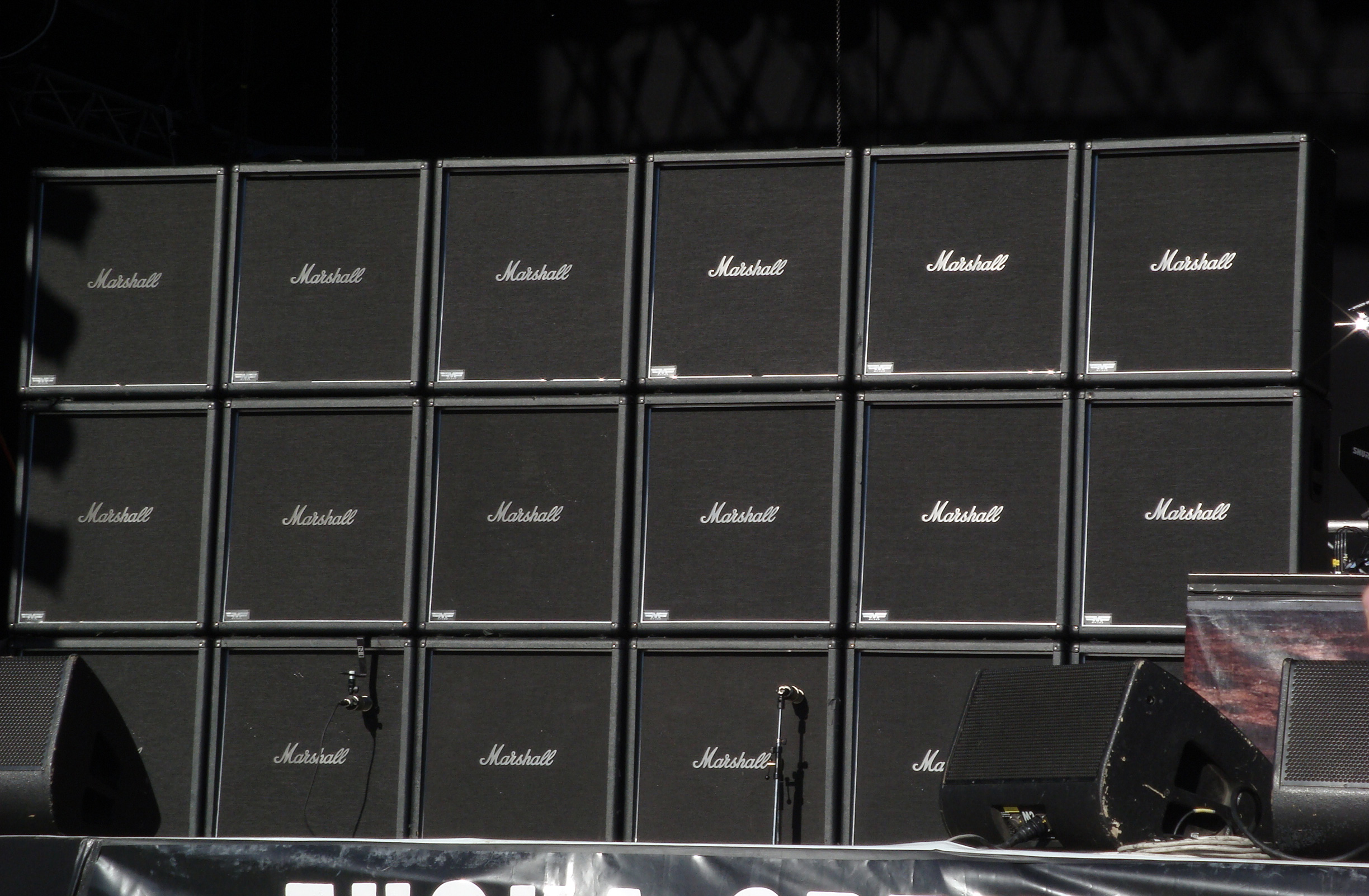
A 3 × 6 stack of Marshall ModeFour guitar cabinets on the main stage of Tuska Open Air Metal Festival in 2008. This setup belonged to Jeff Hanneman of Slayer.

Marshall Amplification is a British company that designs and manufactures guitar amplifiers, speaker cabinets, and effects pedals. Founded in London in 1962 by shop owner and drummer Jim Marshall, the company is based in Bletchley, Milton Keynes, England.

The company first began making amplifiers to provide an alternative to expensive, American-made Fender amps, releasing their first model, the Bassman-inspired JTM45, in 1963. Following complaints over limitations in amp volume and tone from visitors to Jim Marshall's drum shop, notably Pete Townshend, guitarist for the Who, Marshall began developing louder, 100-watt amplifiers. These early amps were characterized in part by their Plexiglass control plates, leading to models such as the 1959 Super Lead (released in 1965) being popularly known as "Plexis." Their adoption by guitarists like Townshend, Jimi Hendrix, Eric Clapton, and Jimmy Page helped establish the brand's legacy. Further development led to the JCM800 series in 1981, which was widely adopted by the hard rock and metal community, while the brand celebrated its 25 years of making amps by releasing the Silver Jubiliee in 1987. Marshall updated the JCM lineup in the 1990s (JCM900) and 2000s (JCM2000) and developed new amp lines, like the DSL and JVM models.

Many of the current and reissue Marshall amps continue to use valves (tubes) rather than transistors, as is common in this market sector. Marshall Amplification also manufactures solid-state, hybrid (vacuum tube and solid state) and modelling amplifiers.

Since 2023, Marshall Amplification has been a division of a Swedish conglomerate, the Marshall Group, a majority stake of which is owned by HSG.

== History ==
=== Origins ===
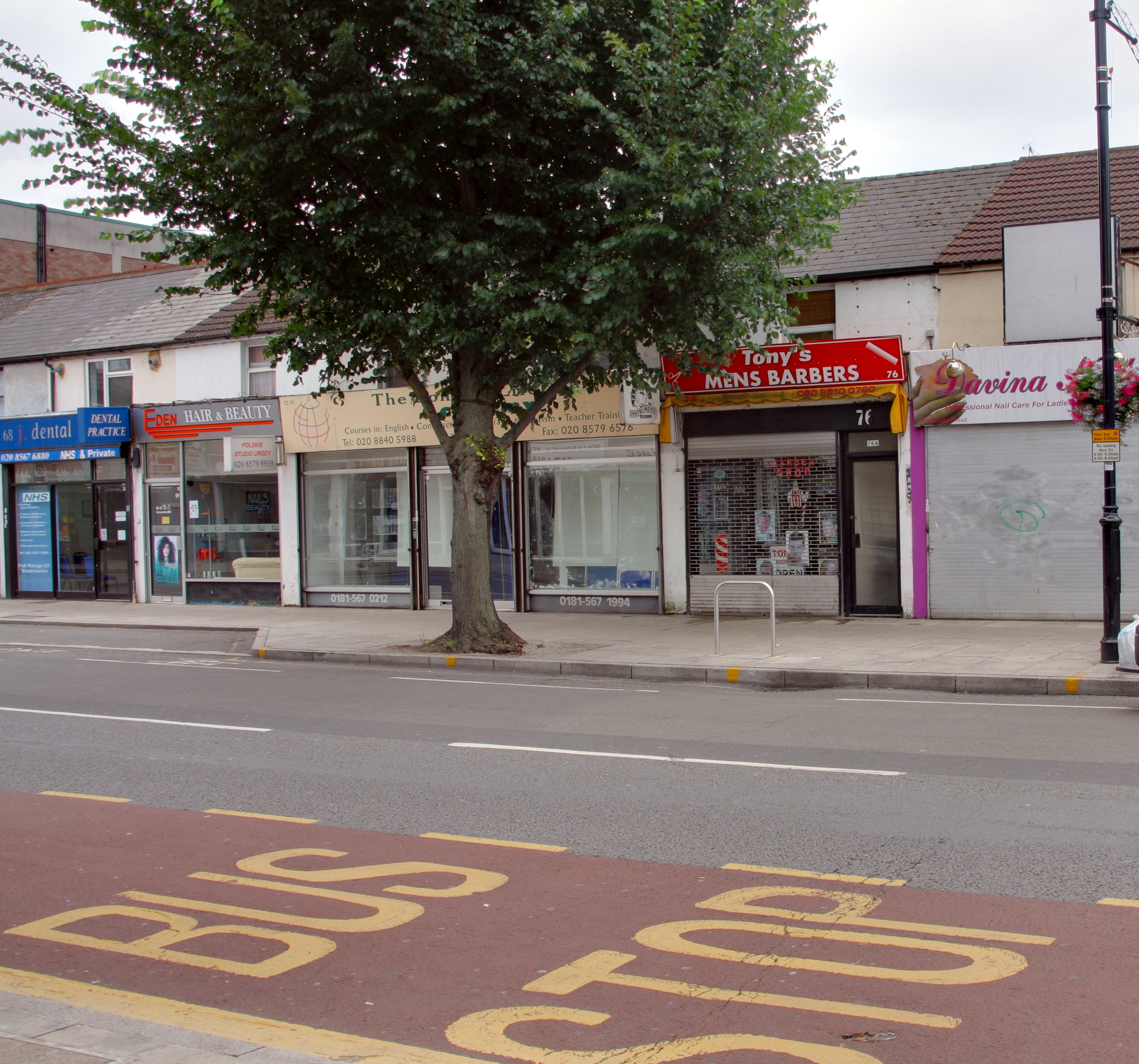
Site of Jim Marshall's first shop at 76 Uxbridge Road, Hanwell, west London, now a men's barber

After a successful career as a drummer and teacher of drum technique, Jim Marshall first went into business in 1962 with a small shop in Hanwell, west London, selling drums, cymbals and drum-related accessories; Marshall himself also gave drum lessons. According to Marshall, Ritchie Blackmore, Big Jim Sullivan and Pete Townshend were the three main guitarists who often came into the shop. They pushed Marshall to make guitar amplifiers and told him the sound and design they wanted. Marshall Limited then expanded, hired designers and started making guitar amplifiers to compete with existing amplifiers, the most notable of which at the time were the Fender amplifiers imported from the United States.

=== Production ===
I believe it was something people were discovering all over London. These big amps that Marshall were turning out — you couldn't stop the guitars feeding back!

— Pete Townshend of the Who.

The company first began making amplifiers to provide an alternative to expensive, Fender amps, releasing their first model, the Bassman inspired JTM45, in 1963. Following complaints over limitations in amp volume and tone from visitors to Jim Marshall's drum shop, notably Townshend of the Who, Marshall began developing louder, 100-watt amplifiers. These early amps were characterised in part by their Plexiglass control plates, leading to models such as the 1959 Super Lead (released in 1965) being popularly known as "Plexis." Their adoption by guitarists like Townshend, Jimi Hendrix, Eric Clapton, and Jimmy Page helped establish the brand's legacy.

Further development led to the JCM800 series in 1981, which was widely adopted by the hard rock and metal community, while the brand celebrated its 25 years of making amps by releasing the Silver Jubiliee in 1987. Marshall updated the JCM lineup in the 1990s (JCM900) and 2000s (JCM2000) and developed new amp lines, like the DSL and JVM models.

Many of the current and reissue Marshall amps continue to use valves (tubes) rather than transistors, as is common in this market sector. Marshall Amplification also manufactures solid-state, hybrid (vacuum tube and solid state) and modelling amplifiers.

=== Distribution deal ===
Marshall entered into a 15-year distribution deal with British company Rose-Morris during 1965, which gave him the capital to expand his manufacturing operations, though it would prove to be costly. In retrospect, Marshall admitted the Rose-Morris deal was "the biggest mistake I ever made. Rose-Morris hadn't a clue, really. For export, they added 55% onto my price, which pretty much priced us out of the world market for a long time."

=== Park amplification ===
The new contract had disenfranchised several of Marshall's former distributors, among them his old friend Johnny Jones. Marshall's contract did not prevent him from building amplifiers outside the company, and so Marshall launched the Park brand name, inspired by the maiden name of Jones's wife. To comply with his contract stipulations, these amplifiers had minor circuit changes compared to the regular Marshalls, and minor changes to the appearance. For instance, often the Parks had silver or black front panels instead of the Marshall gold ones, some of the enclosures were taller or shaped differently, and controls were laid out and labelled differently.

Starting in early 1965, Park produced a number of amplifiers including a 45-watt head. Most of these had Marshall layout and components, though some unusual amplifiers were made, such as a 75 watt keyboard amplifier with KT88 tubes. A 2×12-inch combo had the option of sending the first channel into the second, probably inspired by Marshall users doing the same trick with a jumper cable. The 1972 Park 75 put out about 100 watts by way of two KT88s, whereas the comparable 50-watt Model 1987 of that time used 2 EL34 tubes.

In 1982, Park came to an end, though Marshall later revived the brand for some transistor amplifiers made in Asia. The Parks made from the mid-1960s to around 1974 (the "golden years"), with point-to-point wiring – rumoured to be "a little hotter" than regular Marshalls – fetch higher prices than comparable "real" Marshalls from the same period.

=== Competition from American amplifier companies ===
Marshall began to see more competition from American amplifier companies such as Mesa/Boogie and Soldano. Marshall then updated the JCM800 range with additional models and new features such as "channel switching", which meant that players could switch between clean and distorted tones with the push of a foot-operated switch. This feature debuted in the 2205 (50 watt) and 2210 (100 watt) series and these amplifiers had more preamplifier gain than earlier models, using diode clipping. This meant a solid-state diode added additional distortion to the signal path, akin to adding a distortion pedal. As such the split channel JCM800s were the highest gain Marshalls yet built – "When they were first released, many players were shocked (some were even put off) by its bright, intense distortion – far more than any other amp of the day." Although some valve purists criticised them, these amps were widely used in hard rock. The split-channel JCM800s are still used by Tom Morello (Rage Against the Machine, Audioslave) and were played exclusively by Michael Schenker (UFO) for many years.

Marshall around this time began further experiments with solid-state amplifiers, which were increasingly improving in quality due to technological innovations but were still considered beginner level equipment. Solid-state product lines with the Marshall name sold well, and gave entry-level guitarists a cheaper way to play the same brand as well-known players. One particularly successful entry-level solid-state Marshall was the Lead 12/Reverb 12 combo series, which featured a preamplifier section very similar to a JCM800. These amps were used on record by Billy Gibbons of ZZ Top, and are now in some demand.

=== Solid-state amplifiers ===
Marshall's "Valvestate" amplifiers contained a hybrid of valve and solid-state technology. Currently named the "AVT series" (although these are now out of production, being replaced with the "AVT tribute" for a short time), there are a number of different models, all of which are less expensive than their all-valve counterparts. It is Marshall's current line of "hybrid" amplifier, featuring a 12AX7 preamplifier valve employed in the preamplifier (to "warm up" the signal) as well as solid-state components, with a solid-state power amplifier. These are considered and marketed as intermediate-level equipment to bridge the gap between the higher valve range and lower range MG series.

In 2009, Marshall released their latest variant of the MG line of practice amplifiers. Replacing the MG3 line, the MG4 was designed to offer more features while keeping the controls simple.

=== Other Marshall brand names ===
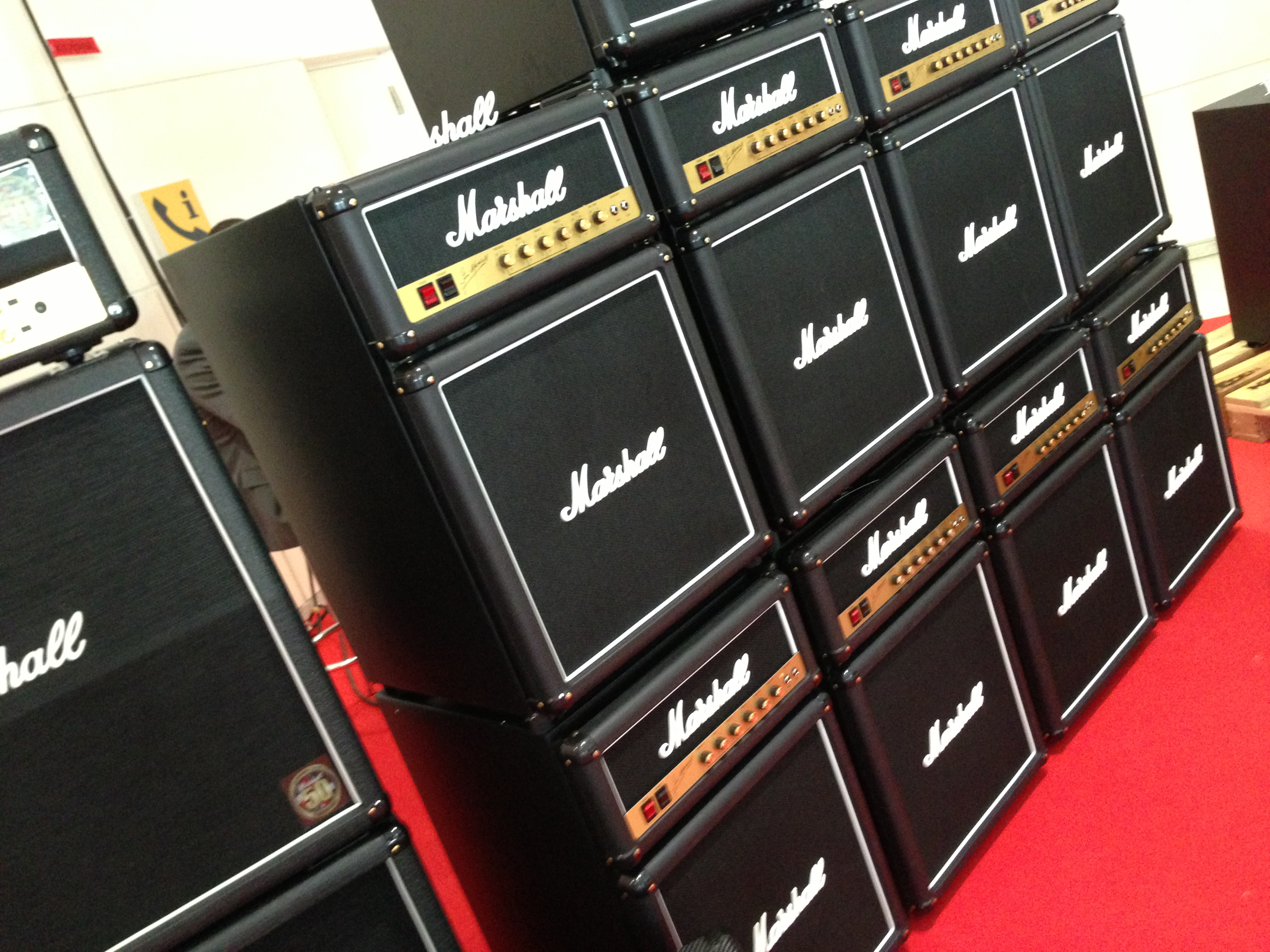
Wall of Marshall Fridge: refrigerator products using Marshall brand.

Other brand names Marshall Amplification had used for various business reasons included Big M (for the then-West German market), Kitchen/Marshall (for the Kitchen Music retail chain in North London), Narb (Ken Bran's surname spelled backwards) and CMI (Cleartone Musical Instruments). Amplifiers sold under these brand names are quite rare, and sell to collectors at high prices.

=== Model number confusion ===
Occasionally confusion has arisen due to Marshall's method of naming each amplifier model, especially during its first few decades, when it was distributed under Rose-Morris. Early amplifier models were simply named after their catalogue number, so for example the 1962 Bluesbreaker was item one thousand, nine hundred and sixty-two in the Rose-Morris catalogue. Later amplifiers were given range designations as well as model numbers, which often indicated information about the amplifier itself, for example the JCM2000 range of amplifiers had models such as the TSL100 (Triple Super Lead 100 W) and combo amplifiers like the TSL122 (Triple Super Lead with 2×12-inch Celestion speakers) other product ranges use similar descriptive model numbers. Often, speaker cabinets designed to suit a particular range will give a prefix before the speaker description such as JVMC212 (JVM cabinet 2×12-inch Celestion speakers) or a suffix C to denote a combo variant of an amplifier such as the Vintage Modern 2266C (Vintage Modern 2 channel 2× KT66 valves Combo).

=== Blackstar ===
In 2007, a group of Marshall employees broke away to start Blackstar Amplification.

== Marshall Stack ==
The classic Marshall Stack consists of one head containing the actual amplifier, on top of two stacked 4×12s, which are loudspeaker cabinets each containing four 12-inch loudspeakers arranged in a square layout. The top cabinet has two loudspeakers angled slightly upwards.

In the early-to-mid-1960s, Pete Townshend and John Entwistle of The Who were responsible for the creation and widespread use of stacked Marshall cabinets. Townshend later remarked that Entwistle started using Marshall Stacks to hear himself over Keith Moon's drums and Townshend himself also had to use them just to be heard over Entwistle. In fact, the very first 100-watt Marshall amplifiers were created specifically for Entwistle and Townshend when they were looking to replace some equipment that had been stolen from them. They approached Jim Marshall asking, if it would be possible for him to make their new rigs more powerful than those they had lost, to which they were told that the cabinets would have to double in size. They agreed and six rigs of this prototype were manufactured, of which two each were given to Townshend and Entwistle and one each to Ronnie Lane and Steve Marriott of The Small Faces. These new "double" cabinets (each containing 8 speakers) proved too heavy and awkward to be transported practically, so The Who returned to Marshall asking if they could be cut in half and stacked, and although the double cabinets were left intact, the existing single cabinet models (each containing four speakers) were modified for stacking, which has become the norm for years to follow.

Entwistle and Townshend both continued expanding and experimenting with their rigs, until (at a time when most bands still used 50–100 W amplifiers with single cabinets) they were both using twin stacks, with each stack powered by new experimental prototype 200 W amplifiers, each connected to the guitar via a Y-splitter. This, in turn, also had a strong influence on the band's contemporaries at the time, with Cream, The Jimi Hendrix Experience and Led Zeppelin following suit. However, due to the cost of transport, The Who could not afford to take their full rigs with them for their earliest overseas tours, thus Cream and Hendrix were the first to be seen to use this setup on a wide scale, particularly in the United States. Although The Who pioneered and directly contributed to the development of the "classic" Marshall sound and setup with their equipment being built and tweaked to their personal specifications, they would only use Marshalls for a couple of years before moving on to using Hiwatt equipment. Cream, and particularly Hendrix, would be widely credited with the invention of Marshall Stacks.

The search for volume led to "daisy chaining" two or more amplifiers together. As most amplifier channels have two inputs, the guitar signal being present on both sockets, a guitarist could connect the spare input of one channel to an input on another amplifier. By 1969, Hendrix was daisy-chaining four stacks, incorporating both Marshall and Sound City amplifiers, as recommended to him by Townshend.

In the early 1970s the band Blue Öyster Cult used an entire wall of full-stack Marshall amplifiers as their backdrop. (BÖC also referred to Marshalls in the songs "Cities on Flame with Rock and Roll" and "The Marshall Plan"). Artists such as Slayer and Yngwie Malmsteen also use walls of Marshalls; both Kerry King and Jeff Hanneman of Slayer would often be seen playing in front of a total of 24 cabinets. Malmsteen toured with 30 heads and 28 cabinets, and in 2011 said he would use 60 full stacks on his next tour.

According to Luke Mitchell of SlashGear, "What makes Marshall so admired is its consistency in tonal quality and build quality across its extensive range."

== Early amplifier models ==
=== Marshall JTM45 ===
Jim Marshall wanted someone to produce a cheaper alternative to American-made guitar amplifiers, but as he had limited electrical-engineering experience he enlisted the help of his shop repairman, Ken Bran, a Pan American Airways technician and Dudley Craven, an EMI apprentice. They most liked the sound of the 4×10-inch Fender Bassman and made several prototypes using the Fender Bassman amplifier as a model. The sixth prototype produced, in Marshall's words, the "Marshall Sound", although at this time the only involvement Marshall had was to sell the amplifiers on a commission basis in his shop. As business increased, Marshall asked the three to work for him in his shop, as he had more space and capital to expand.

The original idea was talked about late one Friday night in early 1963 in a Wimpy bar in Ealing in West London by three amateur radio enthusiasts after they had been to their weekly Greenford radio club meeting, Dudley Craven's call sign was G3PUN, Ken Bran's was G3UDC, and Ken Underwood's was G3SDW. As of Dudley's death in 1998 and Bran's death in 2018, the only original individual is Ken Underwood. The first six production units were assembled in the garden sheds of Bran, Craven, and Underwood in the same year, in Heston, Hanwell and Hayes, all in West London. They were almost copies of the Bassman circuit, with American military-surplus 5881 power valves, a relative of the 6L6. Few speakers then were able to handle more than 15 watts, which meant that an amplifier approaching 50 watts had to use multiple speakers to handle the power. For their Bassman, Fender used four ten-inch Jensen speakers in the same cabinet as the amplifier, but Marshall chose to separate the amplifier from the speakers, and placed four 12-inch Celestion speakers in a separate closed-back cabinet instead of Fender's four 10-inch Jensens in an open-back combo. Other crucial differences included the use of higher-gain ECC83 valves throughout the preamplifier, and the introduction of a capacitor/resistor filter after the volume control. These circuit changes gave the amp more gain so that it broke into overdrive sooner on the volume control than the Bassman, and boosted the treble frequencies. This new amplifier, tentatively called the "Mark II", was eventually named the "JTM 45", after Jim and his son Terry Marshall and the maximum wattage of the amplifier. Jimi Hendrix, Eric Clapton, and other blues rock-based bands from the late 1960s such as Free used Marshall stacks both in the studio and on stage.

=== The Bluesbreaker ===
To reduce costs Marshall started sourcing parts from the UK. This led to the use of Dagnall and Drake-made transformers, and a switch to the KT66 valve instead of the 6L6 tube commonly used in the United States. The changes gave Marshall amplifiers a more aggressive voice, which quickly found favour with players such as Eric Clapton, who would sit in Jim's shop practising. Clapton asked Jim Marshall to produce a combo amplifier with tremolo, which would fit in the boot of his car; this became the "Bluesbreaker" amp. Clapton used this amplifier, along with his 1960 Gibson Les Paul Standard (the "Beano"), on the John Mayall & the Bluesbreakers' 1966 album, Bluesbreakers with Eric Clapton.

=== The Plexi and the Marshall stack ===
The amplifiers from this era are easily identifiable by their acrylic glass (a.k.a. Plexiglas) front panel, which earned them the nickname "Plexi". In 1967, Marshall released a 50-watt version of the 100-watt Superlead known as the 1987 Model. In 1969, the plexiglass panel was replaced by a brushed metal front panel.

Other early customers included Pete Townshend and John Entwistle of The Who, whose search for extra volume led Marshall to design the classic 100-watt valve amplifier. Ken Bran and Dudley Craven, Marshall's developers, doubled the number of output valves, added a larger power transformer and an extra output transformer. Four of these amplifiers were built and delivered to Townshend, and the Marshall Super Lead Model 1959, the original Plexi, was born in 1965. At the request of Townshend, Marshall produced an 8×12-inch cabinet (soon replaced by a pair of 4×12-inch cabinets) on top of which the 1959 amplifier head was placed, giving rise to the Marshall stack, an iconic image for rock and roll. The size of the wall of Marshall stacks "soon became an indicator of the band's status", even when rendered obsolete by improved PA systems; indeed, many of the "ridiculously huge arrays of heads and cabs" included dummies. Still, most modern 100-watt heads have roots in Marshall's design, even though they often contain many more features (or different valves, such as the more American-sounding 6L6 valves).

=== Another valve change ===
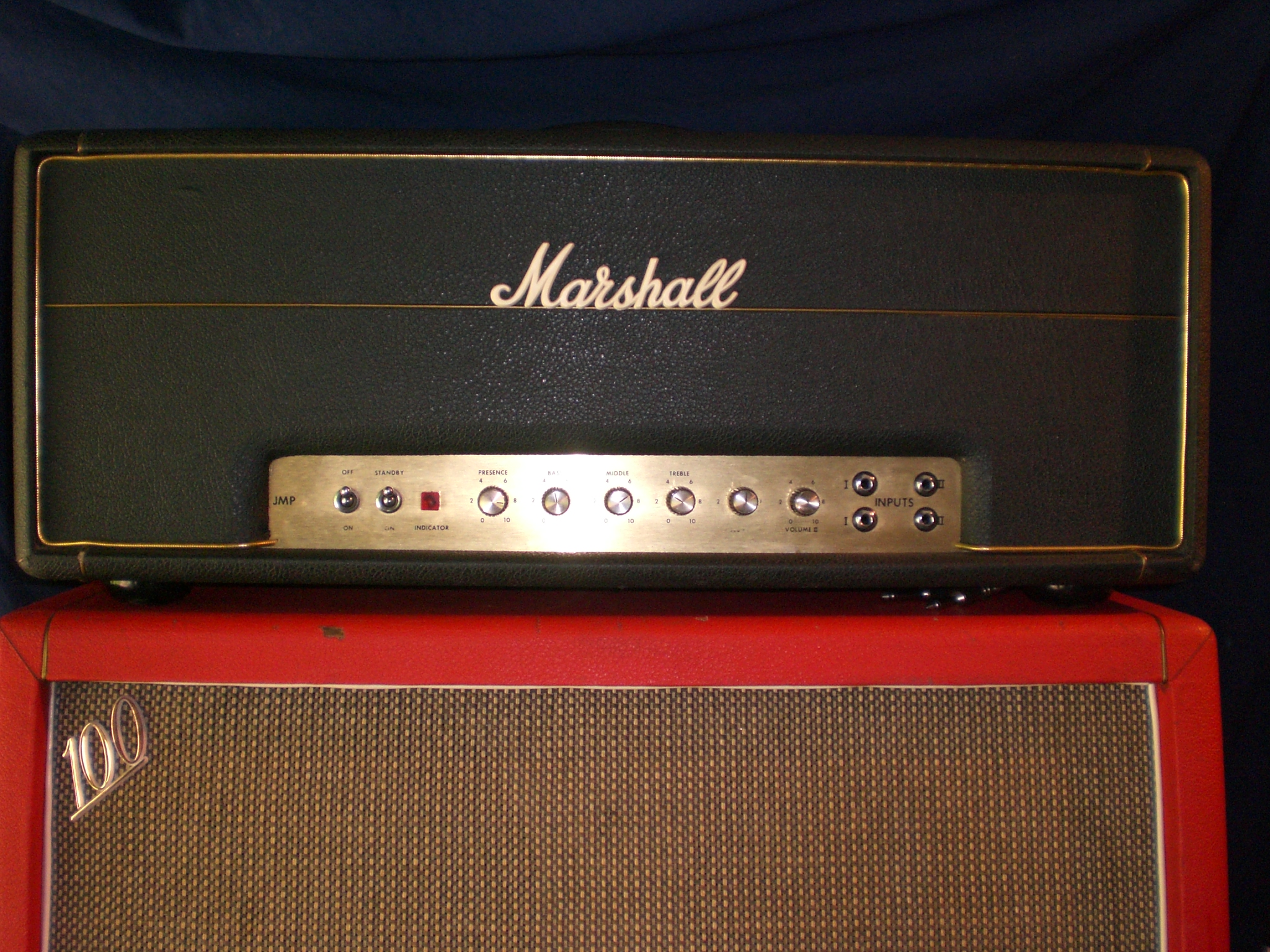
Rare 1971 200-watt Marshall Major

At this time, the KT66 valve was becoming more expensive, as the M-OV Company faced greater competition from Mullard. Hence, another valve change was made, with Marshall starting to use European-made Mullard EL34 power stage valves. These have a different overdrive character than the KT66s, which gave Marshalls a more aggressive voice still. In 1966 Jimi Hendrix was in Jim's shop, trying the amplifiers and guitars. Jim Marshall expected Hendrix to be "another American wanting something for nothing" but to his surprise, Hendrix offered to buy the amplifiers at retail price if Jim would provide him with support for them around the world. Jim Marshall agreed, and several of Hendrix's road crew were trained in the repair and maintenance of the Marshall amplifiers through the years.

== Mid-1970s and 1980s models ==
=== The JMPs ===
After 1973, to streamline production, labour-intensive handwiring was discontinued and Marshall valve amplifiers were switched to printed-circuit-board (PCBs). Much of the debate about the difference in tone between the plexi- and aluminium-panel Marshall amplifiers originates from 1974 when a number of circuit changes were made to the 1959 and 1987 amplifiers; with the addition of 'mkII' added to the 'Super Lead' name on the back panel and 'JMP' ("Jim Marshall Products") added to the left of the power switch on the front panel. Marshall's US distributor Unicord also had them change all the amplifiers sold in the US and Japan to the much more rugged General Electric 6550 instead of the EL34 output tube. The combined effect of different valves and a modified circuit gave these mid-1970s Marshalls a very bright and aggressive sound that was punchier than the EL34 sound, but not as rich, compressed, and had less poweramp distortion.

In late 1975, Marshall introduced the "Master Volume" ("MV") series with the 100W 2203, followed in 1976 by the 50W 2204. This was an attempt to control the volume level of the amplifiers whilst maintaining the overdriven distortion tones that had become synonymous with the Marshall brand. To do this, Marshall designers connected the two input stages in series rather than parallel on the 2203, but not initially on the 2204, and modified the gain stage circuitry to preserve the tonal characteristics of the 'cranked Plexi' sound and converted the now obsolete second channel volume control to a Master Volume by wiring it between the preamplifier and EQ circuit. The 2204 followed suit in early 1977 and changed its preamplifier circuit to match the (then) more popular 2203.

According to Rick Reinckens, who was a short-term Unicord employee electronic technician who tested the first units when they arrived from England, Tony Frank, Unicord's chief design engineer, came up with this idea for a dual-volume-control (a preamplifier gain and a master volume). The circuitry modifications were optimised to replicate the sound of the earlier non-MV Marshalls with the Master Volume control set 'low'; however, players quickly realised that 'cranking' the MV of these new Marshall amplifiers would yield even more overdrive distortion, the tone of which was more cutting and edgy, and later found favour with players such as Randy Rhoads, Zakk Wylde and Slash. The 1959 and 1987 non-master volume models also continued under the JMP line until 1982.

=== JCM800 ===
Soon after the Rose-Morris deal had ended in late 1980, Marshall repackaged two MV models, the 2203 and the 2204 (at 100 and 50 watts, respectively), along with the 1959 and 1987 non-master volume Super Lead in a new box with a new panel, and called it the "JCM800" series (named after his initials and the registration plate of his car). Marshall made several amplifiers under the JCM800 name.

=== The Jubilee ===
The year 1987 marked 25 years in the amplifier business and 50 years in music. This was celebrated with the release of the Silver Jubilee series of amplifiers. The Silver Jubilee series consisted of the 2555 (100 watt head), 2550 (50 watt head) along with other 255x model numbers denominating various combos and even a "short head". The Jubilee amplifiers were heavily based on the JCM800s of the time, featuring a very similar output section along with a new preamplifier. Their most publicised feature was the half-power switching, which is activated by a third rocker switch next to the standard "power" and "standby" switches. On the 50-watt model this was reflected in the numbering – 2550 is switchable from 25 to 50 watts – and also reflected Marshall amplifiers' 25th anniversary and Jim Marshall's 50 years in music. The amplifiers were trimmed in silver covering, and had a bright silver-coloured faceplate, along with a commemorative plaque.

The Jubilee also featured a "semi-split channel" design, in which two different input gain levels could be set, running through the same tone stack and master volume control. This allowed for a "classic Marshall" level of gain to be footswitched up to a modern, medium to high gain sound, slightly darker and higher in gain than the brasher JCM800 sound that typified 1980s rock music. "The sound of these amps is particularly thick and dark, even on the Marshall scale of things. The gain by today's standards is medium." The distortion sound of the Jubilee range is typified by Slash's live work with Guns N' Roses. He rarely used anything else live, but the Jubilee did not appear on any Guns N' Roses studio albums – instead these feature a modified 1977 JMP mkII (non-MV) on Appetite for Destruction (1987) and a modded JCM800 on the subsequent albums. It can be heard on some of the Velvet Revolver material though. The Jubilee amplifiers also featured a "pull out" knob that activated a diode clipping circuit (similar to boosting the amp's input with an overdrive pedal). Other notable Jubilee users include the Black Crowes, John Frusciante (Red Hot Chili Peppers) and Alex Lifeson (Rush), who used it extensively in the recording of Rush's Clockwork Angels (2012) album.

After the Jubilee year, production of the 255x series amplifiers continued until around 1990 in extremely limited numbers, likely due to left over components. These amps have identical circuitry to the 1987 models but reverted to a standard Marshall livery of black and gold. These follow the same model number structure as the 1987 amps but do not have the limited edition badge and lose the "silver jubilee" name.

== 1990s models ==
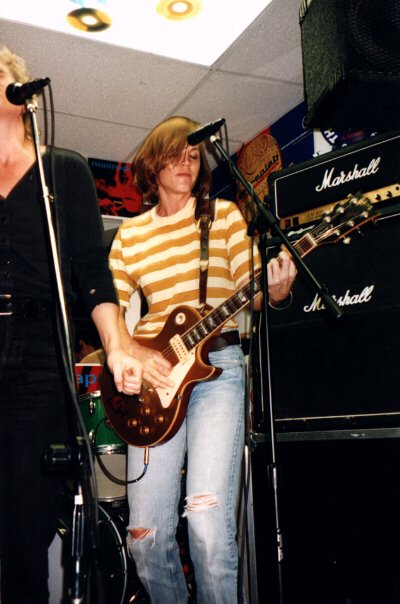
Magnapop guitarist Ruthie Morris playing a Marshall amp in 1994

=== JCM900 ===
In the 1990s, Marshall updated its product line again with the JCM900 series. Reviewed by Guitarist magazine in the UK and given the line, "Shredders, here is an amp you won't need to have modified", this move by Marshall was again an outgrowth of musicians' desires, featuring more distortion than ever and retaining popular aspects of the late JCM800 models. However, some models used solid-state components for much of the distortion, which some guitarists disliked. Still, if not with shredders, the JCM900 line was well received by younger players associated with pop, rock, punk and grunge which was widespread by the early 1990s.

There are three different variants of the JCM900. The most common models are the 4100 (100 watt) and 4500 (50 watt) "Dual Reverb" models, which are a descendant of the JCM800 2210/2205 design. These models feature two channels, a largely solid-state preamplifier, and diode distortion. The 2100/2500 Mark IIIs are essentially JCM800 2203/2204s with added diode clipping controllable via a knob on the front panel and an effects loop. These are fairly uncommon and were not in production for long before being replaced by the 2100/2500 SL-X, which replaced the diode clipping from the Mk III with another 12AX7/ECC83 preamplifier valve. These are easily the highest distortion of the three variants. A number of these were shipped with Sovtek 5881 valves, a ruggedized variant of the 6L6 family of output valves, due to a lack of suitable quality EL34s. Most of the JCM900s and 6100s built between 1994 and 1998 left the factory with the 5881s.

Around this time, Marshall released a few "special edition" amplifiers in this range, including a "Slash Signature" model, a first for the company. This was actually a re-release of the earlier Silver Jubilee 2555 amplifier, with identical internals, a standard Marshall look, and a Slash logo. This amplifier retained EL34s and 3,000 units were produced from 1996 to 1997.

=== 30th Anniversary 6100 series ===
1993 marked 30 years in the amplifier business. To commemorate this milestone, Marshall released the 30th Anniversary series of amplifiers, the EL34 powered 6100LE with commemorative blue covering and gold faceplate, which was followed by the 6100 (in blue tolex and still EL34 powered) and then in 1994 the 6100LM (in standard Marshall livery but now 5881 powered like the JCM900s of the time). All versions of the 6100 had three channels; clean, crunch and lead. The clean channel featured a mid shift, which gave the option of a more "Fender-like" voicing, and the crunch channel featured three modes recreating all the classic Marshall crunch tones of the past three decades. The lead channel featured a switchable gain boost and a mid-range contour switch, which gave it the tone and gain levels, which Marshall's engineers hoped would keep it competitive in the high-gain world in the early to mid-1990s. Some players felt the lead channel was the weakest of the three, and it was revised in the third year of production (the LM standing for "Lead Mod"). This revision featured even higher gain.

The Anniversary series found prominence with Joe Satriani in particular, who favoured the early EL34 powered versions and used only the clean channel live along with his signature Vox Satchurator distortion pedal which is based on his old modded Boss DS-1. Satriani used these older Boss pedals almost exclusively for live work and on a number of studio albums including The Extremist (1992) until the early 2000s. The Anniversary models were probably the most complicated Marshall ever (other than perhaps the later JVM), with MIDI channel selection, half power switching, pentode/triode switching, adjustable speaker excursion, and a low volume compensation switch. Despite all this complication, the amps had a pure signal path that did not share preamplifier valves between channels (unlike later Marshall designs like the TSL and JVM). Other famous 6100 users included Alex Lifeson on Rush's album Test for Echo (1996) and Ocean Colour Scene (OCS) guitarist Steve Cradock.

== Current models ==
=== Modern series ===
Marshall continued with a wide range of amps with the look and sound of the Marshall valve amplifier. The longest-running of such models is the JCM2000 range, which is split into the two- and three-channel series, known as the Dual and Triple Super Leads, as released in 1997.

Marshall's later flagship, the JVM, is made in a variety of models and ranges. These amplifiers have up to four channels, each with three foot-switchable modes.

=== Bass series ===
Marshall currently manufactures a professional, all-valve bass rig called the VBA400. It houses eight 6550 power valves plus three ECC83 and one ECC82 preamplifier valves. The input accommodates both active and passive bass pick-ups; there is also an XLR DI output for recording complete with Earth (grounding) lift and Pre/Post EQ switches. In 2008, Marshall honoured Lemmy Kilmister of Motörhead with their first-ever signature bass amplifier head, based on his 100 watt super bass unit "Murder One".

=== CODE series ===
In 2016, Marshall introduced the CODE series of modelling amplifiers. Developed in conjunction with Softube, the CODE series is digital and includes three combinations and a 100-watt head that has 14 preamps, 4 power amps and eight speaker cabinet combinations that can be controlled via an application.

== Other ventures ==
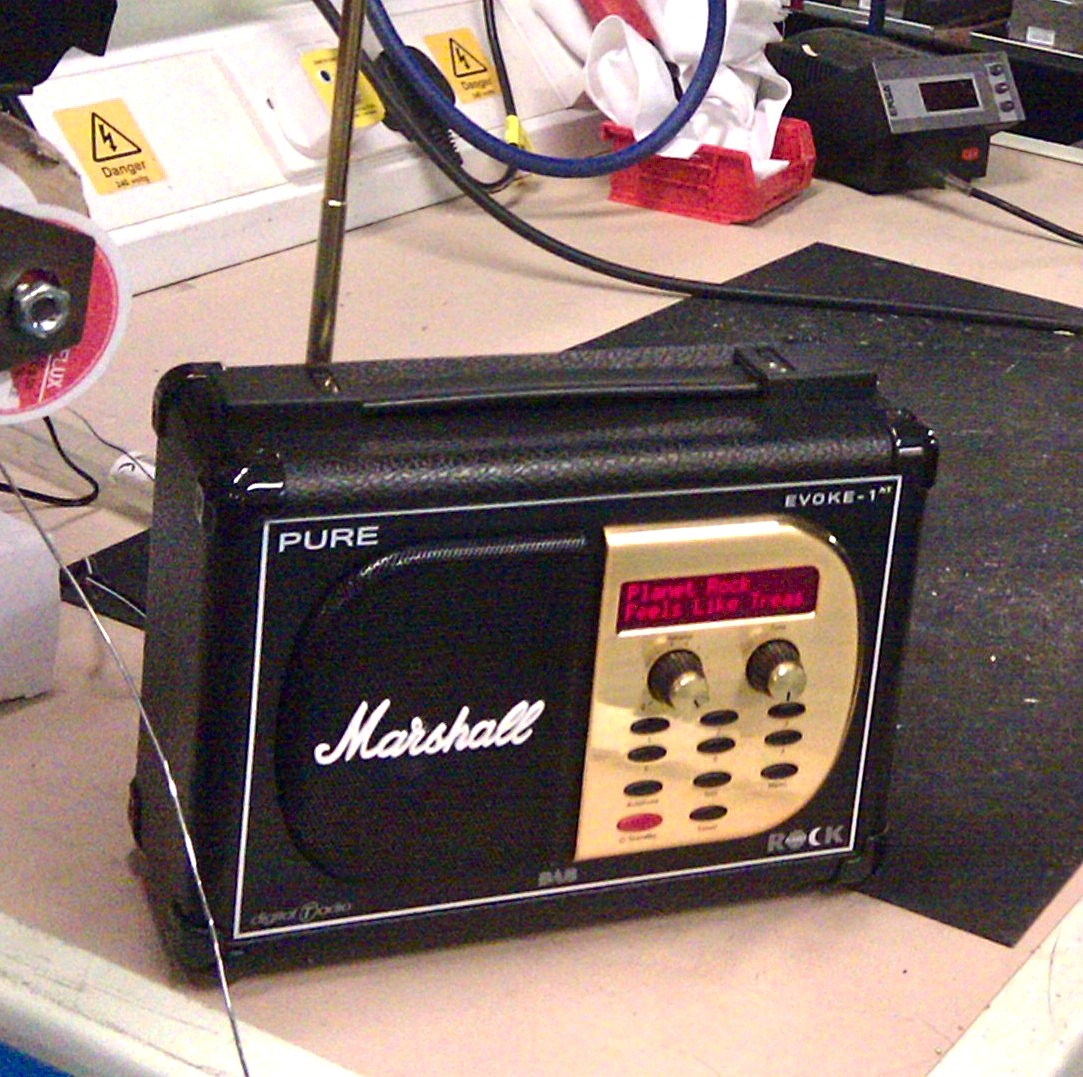
Marshall amp styled DAB radio unit, made in partnership with radio manufacturer Pure and the Planet Rock radio station

=== Headphones and Bluetooth speakers ===
In 2010 Marshall started a partnership with Zound Industries to make headphones and bluetooth speakers, Zound Industries is most known for its Urbanears headphones and have a similar partnership with Adidas to make audio products for them. In August 2018, Marshall announced two smart speakers which run Amazon Alexa.

=== Sport sponsorships ===
Marshall has sponsored several local sports clubs. Marshall were one of the earliest shirt sponsors for Milton Keynes Dons, they also sponsored Milton Keynes Athletic Club as well as Milton Keynes Lions basketball club, before the latter relocated to London.

=== Marshall Records ===
In early 2017, Marshall Amplification announced it has started a record label. and opened up an office at London's Tileyard Studios and signed a distribution deal with Alternative Distribution Alliance, a distribution company owned by Warner Music Group that represent independent record labels. Marshall Records signed a North and South American Distribution deal with Better Noise Music (previously known at Eleven Seven Label Group in 2018. In 2020, Marshall Records announced a sub-publishing deal with Sentric Music.

Artist that have had their music release by Marshall Records include: Bad Touch, D_Drive, Grand Slam, Inklings (the solo project of ex FVK member Kier Kemp), Keywest, King Creature, Press to MECO, Rews, Reigning Days, The Bottom Line, Therapy?, The Dirty Youth, Thousand Thoughts and The Molotovs.

=== Marshall Arena ===
In September 2018, Marshall Amplification announced a naming agreement with Arena MK (at Stadium MK in Milton Keynes) to use the space for music events. The opening act is to be the Black Eyed Peas.

=== The Marshall Studio ===
In 2021, Marshall Amplification opened a recording studio at its base in Bletchley, Milton Keynes. Featuring a Neve 8048 mixing console previously installed in Pathé Marconi in Paris and used by The Rolling Stones on Some Girls.

== See also ==
- List of guitar amplifier manufacturers
- Up to eleven
- Natal Drums, part of the Marshall Group.
