= 807 (vacuum tube) =

Beam tetrode vacuum tube

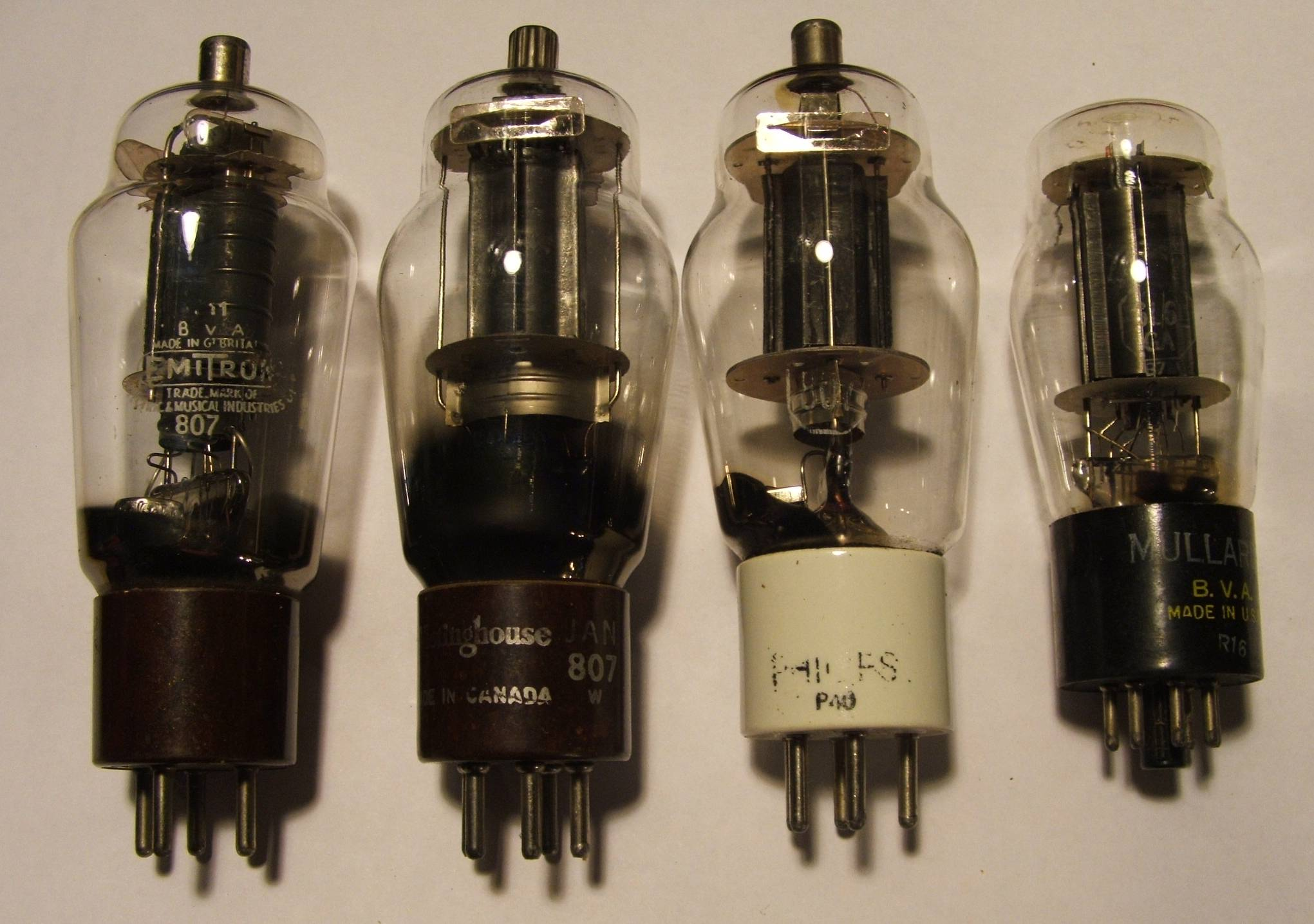
- Three 807s and an early 6L6, Left, British Emitron brand 807; Second Left, Canadian Westinghouse brand 807; Second Right, Dutch Philips brand military 807/ATS25 Right, U.S. Mullard-B.V.A branded 6L6G
- Classification: Beam-power tetrode
- Service: Class-A amplifier, (single-ended) Class-AB amplifier, (push–pull) Class-C amplifier, (radio frequency)

Cathode
- Cathode type: Indirectly heated
- Heater voltage: 6.3
- Heater current: 900 mA

Anode
- Max dissipation Watts: 25 W
- Max voltage: 600 V

Socket connections
- American 5 Pin, (UY) Pin 1, Heater; Pin 2, Screen grid, g2 Pin-3, Control grid, g1 Pin-4, Cathode-beam plates Pin-5, Heater Top cap, Anode/plate

Typical class-A amplifier operation
- Anode voltage: 300 V, (600 V)
- Anode current: 83 mA, (40-75 mA)
- Screen voltage: 250 V, (300 V)
- Bias voltage: -12.5 V, (-29.5 V)
- Anode resistance: 24 kΩ

Typical class-C amplifier operation
- Power output: 24 W, (plate dissipation = 16.5 W max)
- Anode voltage: 475 V
- Anode current: 83 mA
- Screen voltage: 300 V (screen dissipation = 2.5 W max)
- Bias voltage: -50 V

Typical class-AB amplifier operation (Values are for two tubes)
- Anode voltage: 400 V (AB1), 600 V (AB2)
- Anode current: 90-119 mA (AB1), 90-240 mA (AB2),(zero to max signal)
- Screen voltage: 300 V (AB1), 300 V (AB2)
- Bias voltage: -45 V (AB1), -25--30 V (AB2)

References
- Philips Valve Data Book, Philips Electrical Industries, 69-73 Clarence Street, Sydney, Radio Valve Application Division, 1958; Radio Valve Data, Eighth Ed. Iliffe Books Ltd., London, 1966

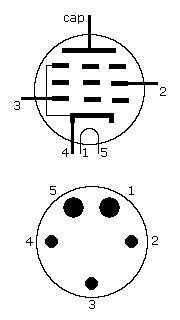
807 tube pinout diagram

The 807 is a beam tetrode vacuum tube, widely used in audio- and radio-frequency power amplifier applications.

== Audio uses ==
807s were used in audio power amplifiers, both for public address and Hi-Fi application, usually being run in push-pull pairs in class AB1 or AB2 giving up to 120 watts of usable power. The plate voltage limit is 750 volts and the screen grid limited to 300 volts. Because of the 300 volt screen grid voltage limit, the 807 cannot be triode connected for high power applications. Failure to observe this precaution will cause screen grid failure. Less commonly a single 807 was used in a pure class-A, single-ended audio output stage delivering about 10 watts.

== RF uses ==
The 807 is fully rated to 60 MHz, derated to 55% at 125 MHz in Class C, Plate-modulated operation, thus they were popular with amateur radio operators (radio hams). In this application a single 807 could be run in class-C as an oscillator or amplifier which could be keyed on and off to transmit Morse Code in CW mode. For voice transmission on AM a final amplifier with one or more 807s, up to about four, could be connected in parallel running class-C. Connecting multiple 807s in parallel produced more power to feed to the antenna. Often the modulator stage (simply a transformer-coupled audio amplifier for A.M., with the secondary of its output transformer in series with the anode supply of the final amplifier), was also constructed using 807s. Many hams found multiple paralleled 807s a cheaper alternative to a single larger valve, such as a single 813, as many military surplus 807s became available cheaply after World War II. In Australia 807s are affectionately referred to as "stubbies" because they are almost as ubiquitous as that common Australian beer container.
The class C operational values in the info box at the right are for anode modulated A.M. operation; for CW operation a maximum anode voltage of 600 is permissible, whereby the anode current increases to 100 mA and the anode/plate dissipation rises to 25 watts. The screen voltage is the same, at 300, but its dissipation rises to 3.5 watts. 37 watts of R.F. power is produced from 220 mW of drive but only a 50% duty cycle is allowed. The maximum allowable negative control grid, g1 excursion allowable is -200 volts and average control grid current is 5mA in both A.M. and CW modes. Later versions could be used on CW with a supply voltage up to 750 V and a current of 100 mA to produce 50-55 watts of output power.

== Differences from 6L6 ==
The electrically similar 6L6 was not favored by hams because high transient voltages on the anode when operating in class C could cause a flashover between pins 2 and 3 on the octal base, whereas the 807 had the anode connected to a top cap, physically distant from all the base pins.

== Derivatives ==
The 1624 (VT-165) is an 807 variant with a directly heated filamentary cathode operating at 2.5 V, 2 A.

The 1625 (VT-136) is an 807 variant with a 12.6 V heater and a 7-pin base. These tubes were used as RF power amplifiers in some of the SCR-274 and AN/ARC-5 "command set" transmitters of WW2. Postwar, 1625 tubes flooded the surplus market, and were available for pennies apiece. Surplus 1625s found some commercial use, notably the use of a pair as modulator tubes in the Heathkit DX-100 amateur transmitter.

The HY-69 is an 807 variant with a 5-pin base and a directly heated filamentary cathode operating at 6.3 V, 1.6 A.

The 5933/807W is a ruggedized military version of the 807. It uses a shorter, straight-sided T12 bulb, which provides better element support for improved microphonics and shock/vibration resistance.

The ATS-25 is a military version with ceramic base.

The Г-807 (G-807) is a Soviet/Russian version. The 6П7С (6P7S) is similar to Г-807, but with an 8-pin octal base.

The 807 also found some use as a horizontal output tube in early TV receivers, particularly those manufactured by DuMont. The 807 design (with some "value engineering" to reduce production cost) was the basis for the first application-specific horizontal sweep tubes such as the 6BG6G and 6CD6G. The redesign mainly involved the omission of some of the internal RF shielding, and the substitution of a bakelite octal base for the micanol or ceramic 5-pin.

In turn, these low cost sweep tube derivatives found some use as RF power amplifiers in homebrew amateur radio transmitters in the 1950s.

== Slang ==
Ham operators in the US sometimes use the term "807" to refer to bottles of beer due to the shape of the tube.

== See also ==
- KT66
- KT88
- 6L6
- 6CA7 / EL34
- 6V6
- SY4307A
