= KT90 =

The KT90 is a vacuum tube used in audio applications. Typically, it is used in hi-fi or electric guitar amplifier applications. KT90 was developed by Elektronska Industrija Niš (EI). KT90 is designed by Blagomir Bukumira, a leading engineer at EI.

== Features ==
The KT90, or in full, "Kinkless Tetrode 90", is a beam power tetrode and features the same octal socket as its smaller variant, the KT88. It may therefore be used as a substitute, given appropriate re-biasing when used in push-pull configuration.

The KT90 is currently manufactured by Electro-Harmonix, who claim that, despite its different construction, it possesses similar sound characteristics to the EL34 valve. Semi-formal research has been conducted by U.K. supplier Watford Valves who have published a test report. (This research is described here as "semi-formal" because it consists primarily of listening evaluations which may be subjective, rather than electrical analyses of performance parameters in either numerical or graphical form.)
