= Marshall Major =

Guitar amplifier made by Marshall

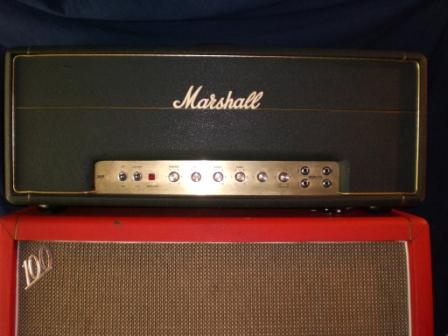
A Marshall Major.

The Marshall Major (model 1967) was a guitar amplifier made by British manufacturer Marshall between 1967 and 1974. Initially dubbed the Marshall 200, the Major was designed to produce more volume and clean headroom than the brand's other amplifiers like the Super Lead.

== History ==
By the mid-1970s, guitar amplifier manufacturers were engaged in a "power war": as rock became harder, artists found themselves playing ever-larger venues that required more and more volume. According to Vintage Guitar, greater power and volume became "part of the style" of rock music itself. Guitarists like Pete Townshend of the Who and Jimi Hendrix responded by running a pair of full stacks simultaneously. Some players, however, wanted that extra power from a single full stack, and Marshall responded in 1967 with the 200, a 200-watt amplifier head driven by KT88 tubes. Marshall advertised it as the "World's most powerful distortion-free amplifier." Following a modest redesign in 1968, Marshall changed the name to the Major, which was produced until 1974 when the supply of KT88s ran out.

Ritchie Blackmore of Deep Purple and Mick Ronson of David Bowie's band are frequently associated with the Major. Blackmore had his Major modified so the two input channels "cascaded" into each other to produce more distortion, essentially creating the first Marshall with a master volume. Jimmy Page of Led Zeppelin and Stevie Ray Vaughan also used them.

== Design ==
While aesthetically similar to Marshall's "Plexi" amplifiers like the famed Super Lead, the 200/Major used a significantly different design. Compared to the Super Lead's 100-watt, EL34-powered "crunch" style of distortion, the amp produced 200 watts of power via four KT88 power tubes for maximum volume and clean headroom. The 200 had only three controls on the front panel and used a preamplifier circuit that was closer in design to a hi-fi amplifier rather than a guitar amp. Two significant parts of this were the use of a lower-gain ECC82 (12AU7) tube as a phase inverter and the use of "ultra-linear" output stages.

In 1968, Marshall updated the 200 with a typical EQ compliment of treble, middle, bass, and presence controls, and it was now named the Major. This tone stack—which was passive compared to the 200's active controls—was placed between the second and third gain stages created using ECC83 (12AX7) preamp tubes. This was in contrast to Marshall's typical placement of the tone stack after a cathode follower stage consisting of the second preamp tube, and this brought the design closer to Fender's amps of the period.

== Other versions ==
The Major was also made as a PA amplifier, Model 1966 (from 1967 to 1971, with eight inputs in four channels; known in 1967 as the PA 200), and as a bass amplifier, Model 1978 (from 1967 to 1974). A line of on-ear headphones by Marshall have also been issued with the same name.

== Notable users ==
- Jimi Hendrix
- Ritchie Blackmore
- Tom Bukovac
- John Frusciante
- Josh Klinghoffer
- Joe Perry
- Mick Ronson
- Stevie Ray Vaughan
- Dan Andriano
- Frank Zappa
- Lemmy Kilmister
