= Marshall Super Lead =

Model of guitar amplifier

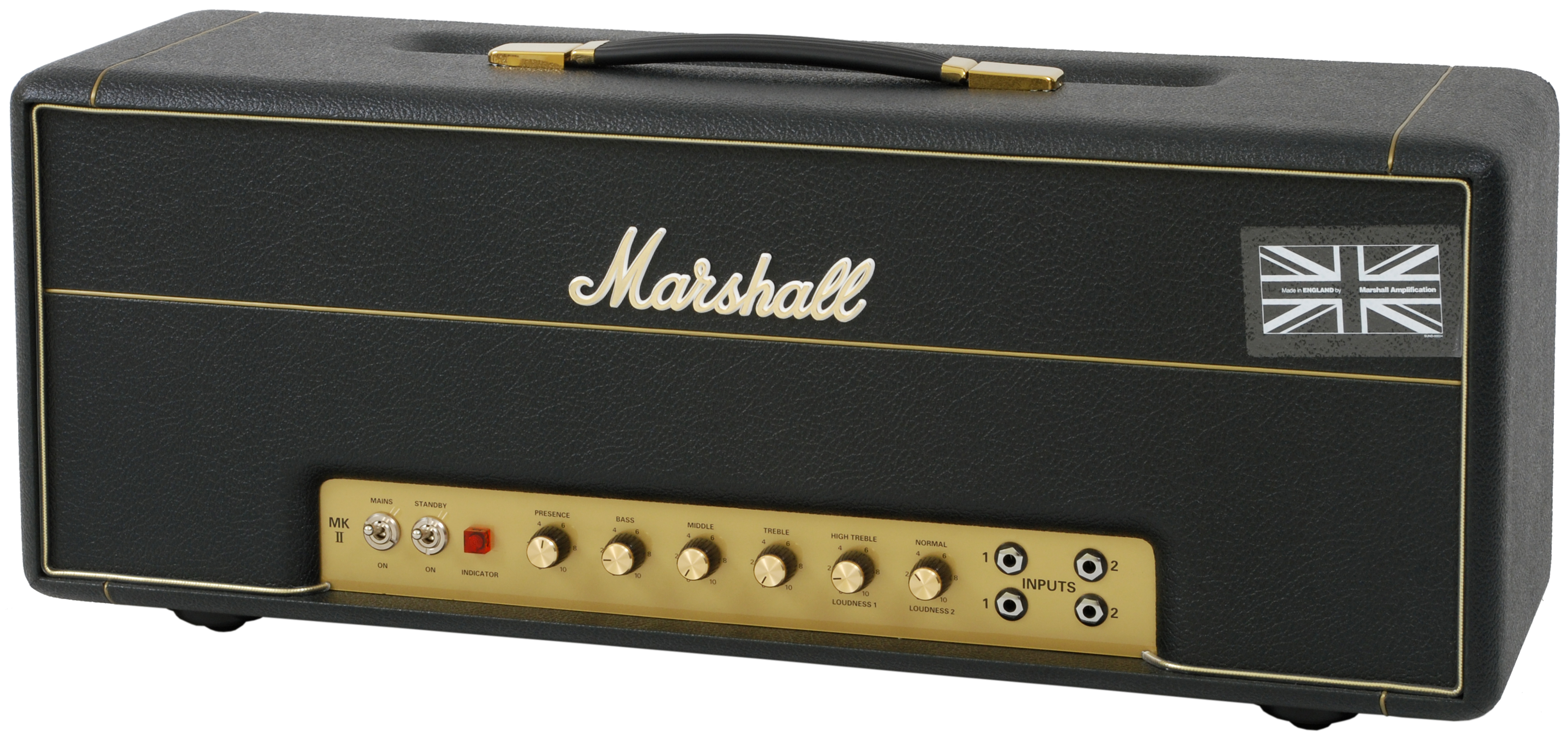
Marshall 1959

The Marshall JMP 1959 Super Lead 100, often shortened to Super Lead or 1959, (Note: These four-digit numbers do not indicate years, but are rather model numbers decided by Marshall's then-distributor Rose-Morris.) is a guitar amplifier made by Marshall between 1966 and 1981. The Super Lead was developed in response to player requests for a 100-watt amp, with several revisions to Marshall's earlier JTM45 resulting in an aggressive, midrange-heavy sound that helped establish the brand's signature "Marshall crunch". The Super Lead had two channels and four inputs but no master volume, meaning its distortion was produced by pushing its power amp to (or near) its maximum capacity. Like other Marshall amplifiers of the time, the Super Lead briefly used Plexiglas control panels, giving rise to the "Plexi" moniker in reference to these amplifier models and their characteristic sound, with the Super Lead being the most closely associated with the label. Often paired with two 4x12 speaker cabinets—a combination popularly known as the "Marshall stack"—the Super Lead has been used by many influential guitarists, among them Angus Young, Pete Townshend, Jimi Hendrix, Eric Clapton, Jeff Beck, Jimmy Page, Eddie Van Halen, and Billie Joe Armstrong. Music Radar dubbed the Super Lead "arguably the most famous amp of all time."

== History ==
=== Development ===
Following the release of the JTM45 in 1963, guitarists like Pete Townshend of the Who felt Marshall's amplifiers were not loud enough. Marshall designers Ken Bran and Dudley Craven initially tried to address this by building a prototype that paired the JTM45's preamp with a power amp section utilizing four 6L6 tubes and a GZ34 rectifier tube, but existing output transformers proved insufficient. A second prototype again used four 6L6 power tubes but now had two GZ34 rectifier tubes and two output transformers, resulting in an 80-watt amplifier that was effectively two JTM45s in one box. A third prototype—now loaded with KT66 power tubes and using a silicon solid-state rectifier—not only met but exceeded Marshall's 100-watt goal, and the brand put it into production as the JTM45/100 in 1965. The JTM45/100's dual-transformer setup, however, lasted less than a year: in September 1965, Marshall's supplier Drake released its first 100-watt output transformers, and Marshall quickly switched to them. The amp's rear panel text was also subsequently changed to "Super 100 Amplifier", while factors like voltages and chokes were continually changed as Marshall fine-tuned the circuit.

=== Release ===
In 1966, Marshall released its new 100-watt amplifier, which Marshall's distributor Rose-Morris assigned the model number 1959. While the 1959 initially used leftover JTM-branded front panels, the back panel text was updated to "Super Lead 100W". Marshall notably altered the amp shortly after its release by incorporating a new transformer and switching to EL34 power tubes. These factors combined to make the amp louder, dirtier, and bolder-sounding than before. Rose-Morris, though, was unimpressed by the Super Lead and did not properly recognize it in their catalog until 1967. By that point, guitarists like Pete Townshend, Jimi Hendrix, and Eric Clapton had all bought Super Leads directly from Marshall and this widespread exposure left Marshall struggling to keep up with demand.

The Super Lead's output was initially channeled into an 8×12" speaker cabinet, but it proved unwieldy with its size and weight and was replaced with a pair of smaller 4x12" speaker cabinets instead: a 1960a "angled" cabinet on top and 1960b "box" cabinet below, a combination that would become famous as the "Marshall stack". By the end of 1967, the amp's JTM logo was replaced with a "JMP" logo, standing for Jim Marshall Products. A significant design change followed, with the switch to a split-cathode preamp circuit, which was introduced to the Super Lead in 1968 and resulted in a tighter, more aggressive sound. This was followed later that year by additional changes to preamp filter values and then in 1969 a resistor value adjustment for the brighter channel. 1969 was also the year that Marshall introduced the use of aluminum for their amps' control panels in place of the original Plexiglas.

In the 1970s, guitar technicians modifying amplifiers became a popular means of addressing the simplicity of the era's circuits and the general unreliability of amps pushed to their max. Common additions to Marshalls like the Super Lead included a master volume, second channel, switchable gain boost, and effects loop. Guitarists like Eddie Van Halen, Steve Lukather, and Eric Johnson notably used modded Super Leads. Many of these changes found their way into subsequent Marshall amp designs like the Super Lead beginning in the mid-1970s. These later Super Leads featured a rawer, dirtier sound that helped maintained the model's popularity as hard rock bands gained prominence in the new decade.

In 1975, Marshall introduced its first "Master Volume" series model, the 2203, to great success: the factory inclusion of a master volume allowed players to achieve the brand's sought-after overdriven tones at reasonable volumes compared to the Super Lead. Despite this development, Marshall continued to expand on the Super Lead's format, offering a 2x12 combo version (model 2159) beginning in 1977 and adding foot-switchable reverb and boost functions to the original head (model 2959) the following year, but all of the Super Lead/1959 models had been discontinued by 1981.

== Variants ==
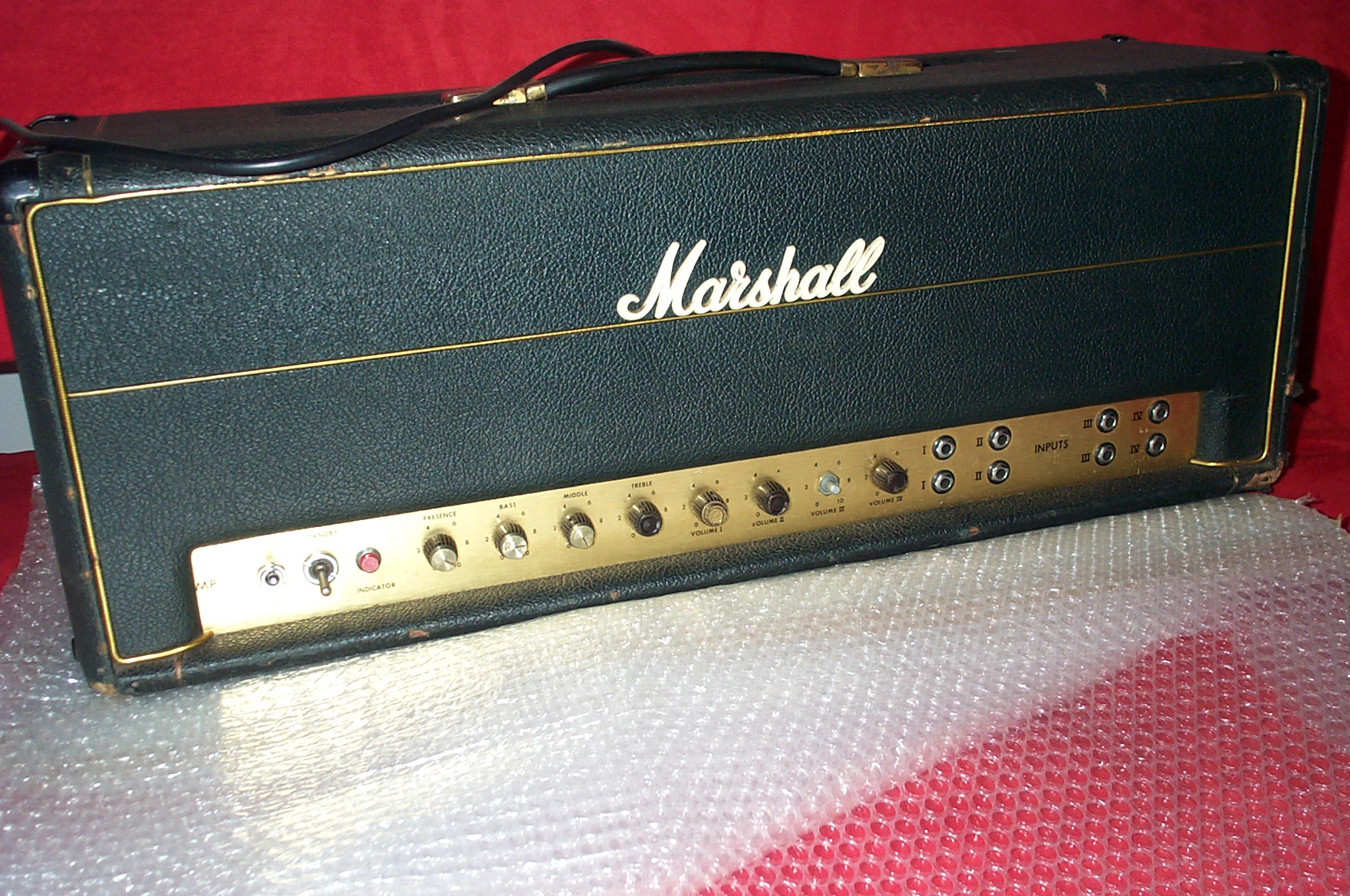
A Super PA 100

The Super Lead was released in 1966 alongside bass and PA system versions.

=== Super Bass ===
The JMP 1992 Super Bass 100 shared a virtually identical circuit to the Super Lead, with its most significant difference being the lack of the Super Lead's 500pF bright cap, which resulted in a mellower tone and more headroom. The Super Bass also had minor component value differences and an altered signal cap value that allowed more low-end content to pass through. It was discontinued in 1981.

=== Super PA ===
The JMP 1968 Super PA 100 featured four channels and eight inputs. It was initially the only 100-watt model of Marshall's that Rose-Morris was willing to advertise upon its release. Marshall discontinued it in 1975.

== Features ==
The Super Lead, like earlier Marshall amp models, came in black tolex, with gold piping and initially a gold-colored Plexiglas control panel. The controls consisted of four input jacks that fed two parallel preamps, with a shared three-band equalizer section and presence knob. Unlike later amplifiers, the Super Lead had no master volume or ability to switch channels and is generally thought to sound best at the highest volume. It had three ECC83 (12AX7) tubes in the preamp stage and delivered 100 watts of power via a quartet of EL34 tubes in the power section. A model with tremolo, the 1959T, was available until 1972, but was not popular, although Pete Townshend was a notable fan who preferred them.

The first channel had a brighter tone, and the second channel a flatter response, with the four inputs divided between high and low gain, with the low gain inputs attenuated by 6 dB. The channels were frequently "jumped", or linked with an instrument cable to feed a guitar through both channels simultaneously for increased gain while giving users the ability to dial in a thicker tone by balancing the volumes of each channel.

== Sound ==
While the Super Lead provided guitarists with significant clean headroom, it was primarily known for its overdriven tones. The Super Lead's core character was bold and midrange-heavy with a bright top-end: Vintage Guitar described the amp as having a "gut-punching thud, midrange grind, and crispy crackly high-end sizzle" that epitomized the sound of rock music for the following decades. Guitar.com described playing a full-volume Super Lead as having a "chest-thunk feel" and noted its "compressed, biting attack" and long sustain that was ideal for blues and rock. Because its overdrive was derived entirely from its EL34-equipped power amp section, the Super Lead famously had to be played at extremely high volumes to achieve the grinding, saturated sound that became known as the "Marshall crunch". The Super Lead was also known for its wide dynamic response, with players being able to go from clean tones to heavy overdrive with only the guitar's volume knob.

== Legacy ==
=== Notable early users ===
Pete Townshend of the Who was an early adopter of the Super Lead, as was Eric Clapton, who in 1966 traded in his Bluesbreaker combo for a Super Lead after cofounding Cream. Jimi Hendrix used a 1959 with four 4×12" cabinets (his "couple of great refrigerators") at the 1969 Woodstock Festival. Many guitarists preferred Super Leads made in certain years: Eddie Van Halen famously used a 1968 model, while Hendrix and Eric Johnson preferred 1969s. Early 1970s models were in turn favored by Thin Lizzy, Judas Priest, and AC/DC.

The Super Lead's bass companion, the Super Bass, found prominent bass-playing fans in Jack Bruce, Chris Squire, and Lemmy, but also proved popular among guitarists for its mellower sound: Jimmy Page and Paul Kossoff both preferred the Super Bass over the Super Lead.

Given its prominence among rock guitarists, the Super Lead is regarded as the "definitive rock amp".

=== Plexi moniker ===
One of Marshall's most characteristic design elements in its amplifiers of the mid to late 1960s was the use of gold-colored Plexiglas control panels, so much so that the term "Marshall Plexi", or simply "Plexi", became popular in reference to these amp models and, more broadly, their characteristic sound. However, the 1959 100-watt Super Lead is generally thought of as the "definitive" Plexi and continued to be popularly referred to as such even after Marshall began using a cheaper aluminum alternative in 1969, although the brand continued using Plexiglas alongside aluminum until stock ran out in 1973. Despite the term's popularity, Marshall themselves have never released an amplifier using the Plexi name, although they would later offer a reissue model called the 1959SLP, short for "Super Lead Plexi".

=== Reissues and signature models ===
The amplifier was reissued for the first time in 1988 (the 1959S), and again from 1991 to 1993 (the 1959X) and from 1993 to 1995 (the 1959SLP). The SLP continued after 1995 but in 2000 Marshall added modifications to lower the noise floor (hum balance pot), reverted the negative feedback resistor to the 1968-69 value of 47 kΩ, and added an effects loop. The 1959SLP was sold until 2017. In 2005 Marshall introduced the 1959HW (for "hand-wired"), based on the 1967–1969 models, with negative feedback added corresponding to the 1969 model. This amplifier was called "expensive but good." Guitar Player magazine called the 1959 "monumentally huge, frightfully loud, and painfully expensive", and its review of the 1959HW said it was "quick, percussive, articulate," and required a "total commitment to volume." In 2025, Marshall released the 1959 Modified amplifier, a hand-wired Super Lead reissue that incorporated several common modifications from during its initial production run, like a master volume, bright switch, and clipping switch.

In 2026, Marshall released the 1959BJA Billie Joe Armstrong Artist Signature amplifier, the brand's first signature amp model in fourteen years. The 1959BJA is a recreation of the Green Day frontman's long-used pair of Super Leads (both modified for increased distortion) and comes in a light blue tolex covering in homage to "Blue", Armstrong's first electric guitar.
