= KT88 =

Output beam tetrode

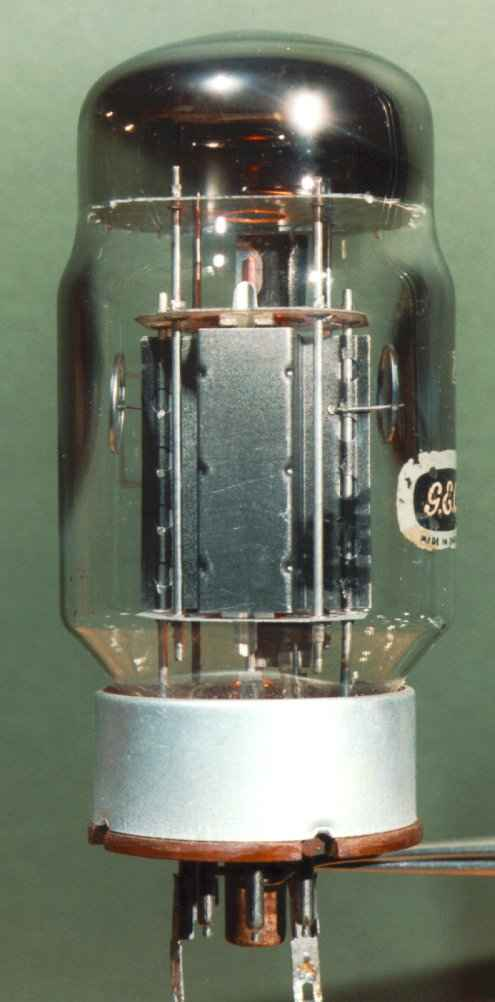
- KT88 labeled G.E.C. made by GEC/MOV in the U.K.
- Classification: Beam-power tetrode
- Service: Class-A amplifier, (single-ended) class-AB amplifier, (push-pull)

Cathode
- Cathode type: Indirectly-heated
- Heater voltage: 6.3
- Heater current: 1.6A

Anode
- Max dissipation Watts: 42W
- Max voltage: 800

Socket connections
- Octal base, (IO) Pin 1, Not used Pin 2, Heater; Pin-3, Anode/plate; Pin-4, Screen grid, g2 Pin-5, Control grid, g1 Pin-6, Not used Pin-7, Heater Pin-8, Cathode-beam plates

Typical class-A amplifier operation
- Anode voltage: 250V
- Anode current: 140mA
- Screen voltage: 250V
- Bias voltage: -15V
- Anode resistance: 12 kilohms

Typical class-AB amplifier operation (Values are for two tubes)
- Power output: 100W
- Anode voltage: 600V
- Anode current: 100mA
- Screen voltage: 350V
- Bias voltage: -45 (class AB2)

References
- Super Radiotron Tube Manual, Amalgamated Wireless Valve Co. Australia, June 1962; Radio Tube Data, Eighth Ed. Ilife Books Ltd., London, 1966

The KT88 is a beam tetrode/kinkless tetrode (hence "KT") vacuum tube for audio amplification.

== Features ==
The KT88 fits a standard eight-pin octal socket and has similar pinout and applications as the 6L6 and EL34. Specifically designed for audio amplification, the KT88 has higher plate power and voltage ratings than the American 6550. It is one of the largest tubes in its class and can handle significantly higher plate voltages than similar tubes, up to 800 volts. A KT88 push-pull pair in class AB1 fixed bias is capable of 100 watts of output with 2.5% total harmonic distortion or up to about 50W at low distortion in hi-fi applications. The transmitting tubes TT21 and TT22 have almost identical transfer characteristics to KT88 but a different pinout, and by virtue of their anode being connected to the top cap have a higher plate voltage rating (1.25 kilovolt) and a higher power output capability of 200 watts in class AB1 push–pull.

The screen grid is sometimes tied to the anode so that it becomes effectively a triode with a lower maximum power output.

== History ==
The KT88 was introduced by GEC in 1956 as a larger variant of the KT66. It was manufactured in the U.K. by the MOV (Marconi-Osram Valve) subsidiary of G.E.C, also labelled as IEC/Mullard, and, in the U.S., Genalex Gold Lion.

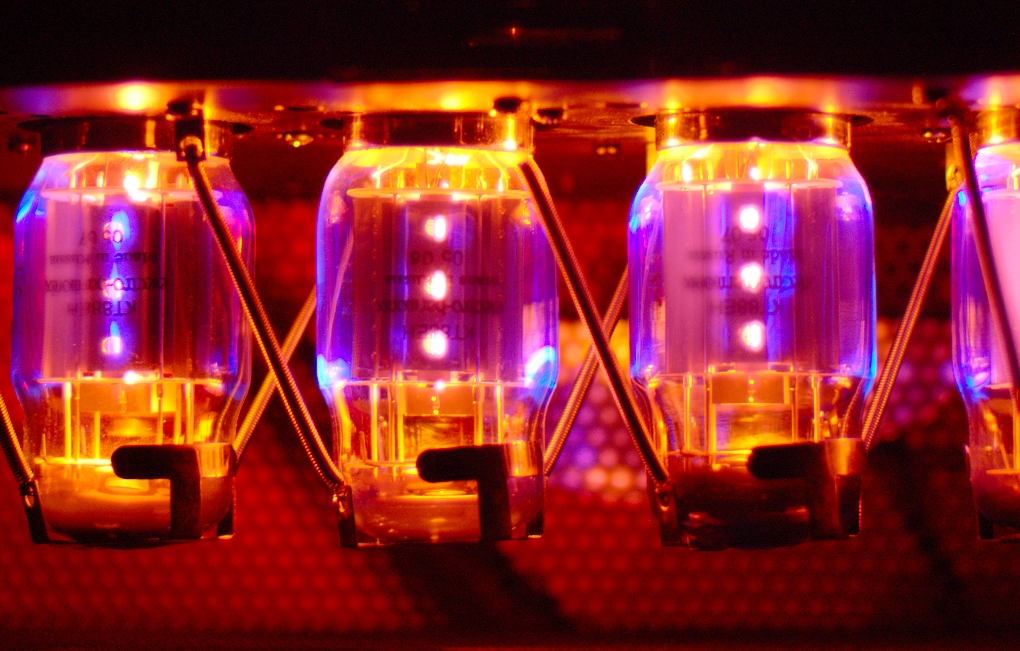
Four KT88s installed and powered.

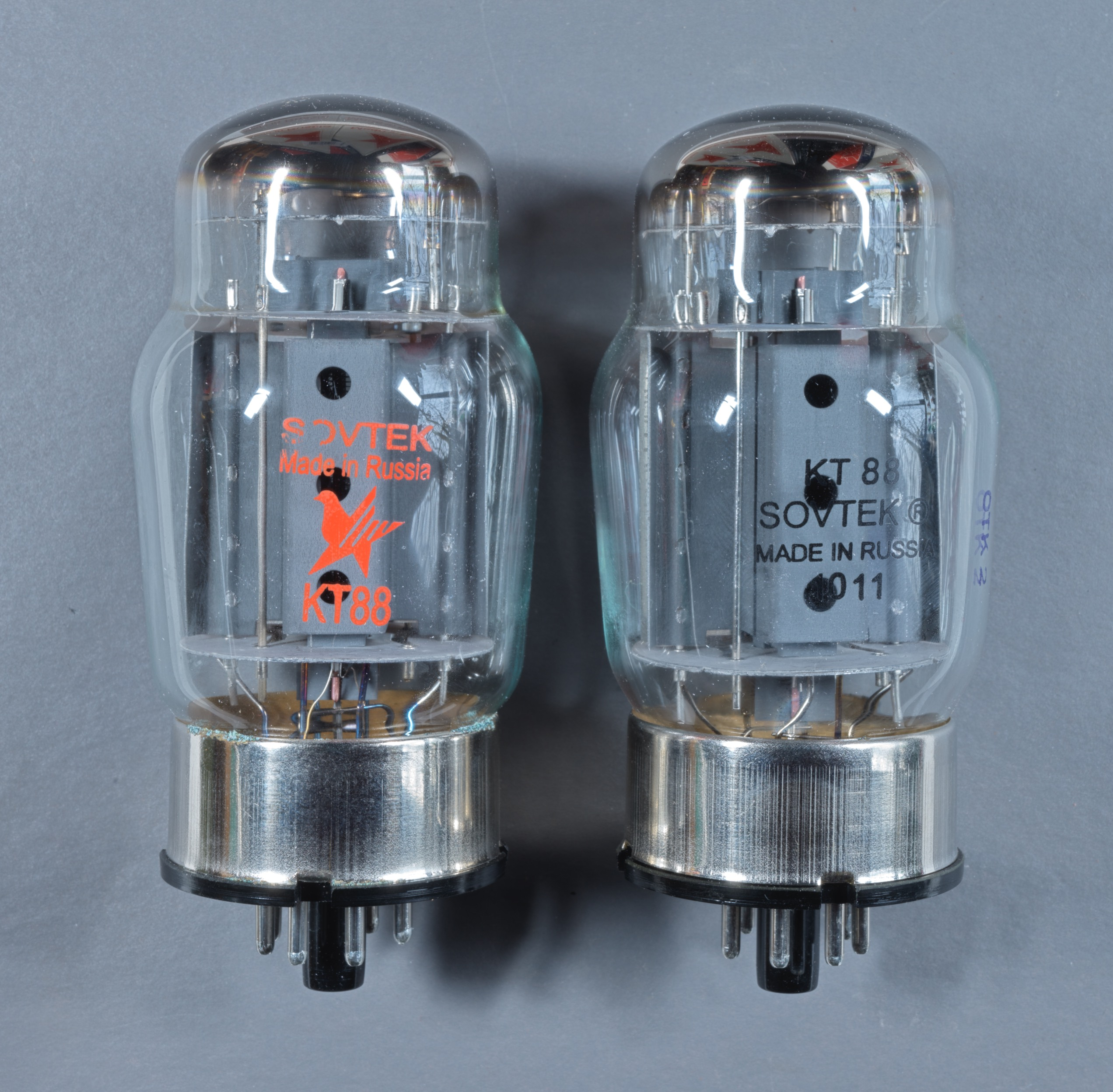
Two KT88 made by Sovtek

As of 2022, KT88 valves are produced by New Sensor Corporation (Genalex Gold Lion and Electro-Harmonix brands) in Saratov, Russia, JJ Electronic in Čadca, Slovakia and Hengyang Electronics (Psvane brand) at former Guiguang factory in Foshan, China.

NOS examples in good condition are extremely rare. Due to its availability and characteristics, the KT88 is popular in hi-fi production amplifiers.

Historically, it has been far more popular with high fidelity stereo manufacturers than guitar amplifier builders, given its characteristics of high-power and low-distortion. Due to these characteristics, it is regularly used to replace 6550 tubes by end users seeking a guitar amplifier tone with less distortion. Some of the amplifiers which shipped with the KT88 power tube include the Hiwatt, Marshall Major, and some Ampeg models.

== Characteristics ==
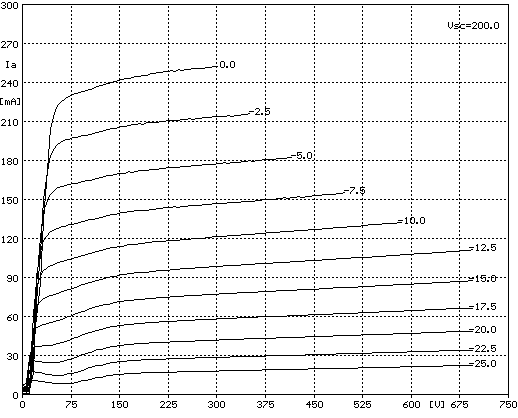
Anode characteristics

== See also ==
- KT66
- KT90
- 6L6
- 6CA7 / EL34
- 6V6
- 807
