= Beam tetrode =

Type of tetrode vacuum tube

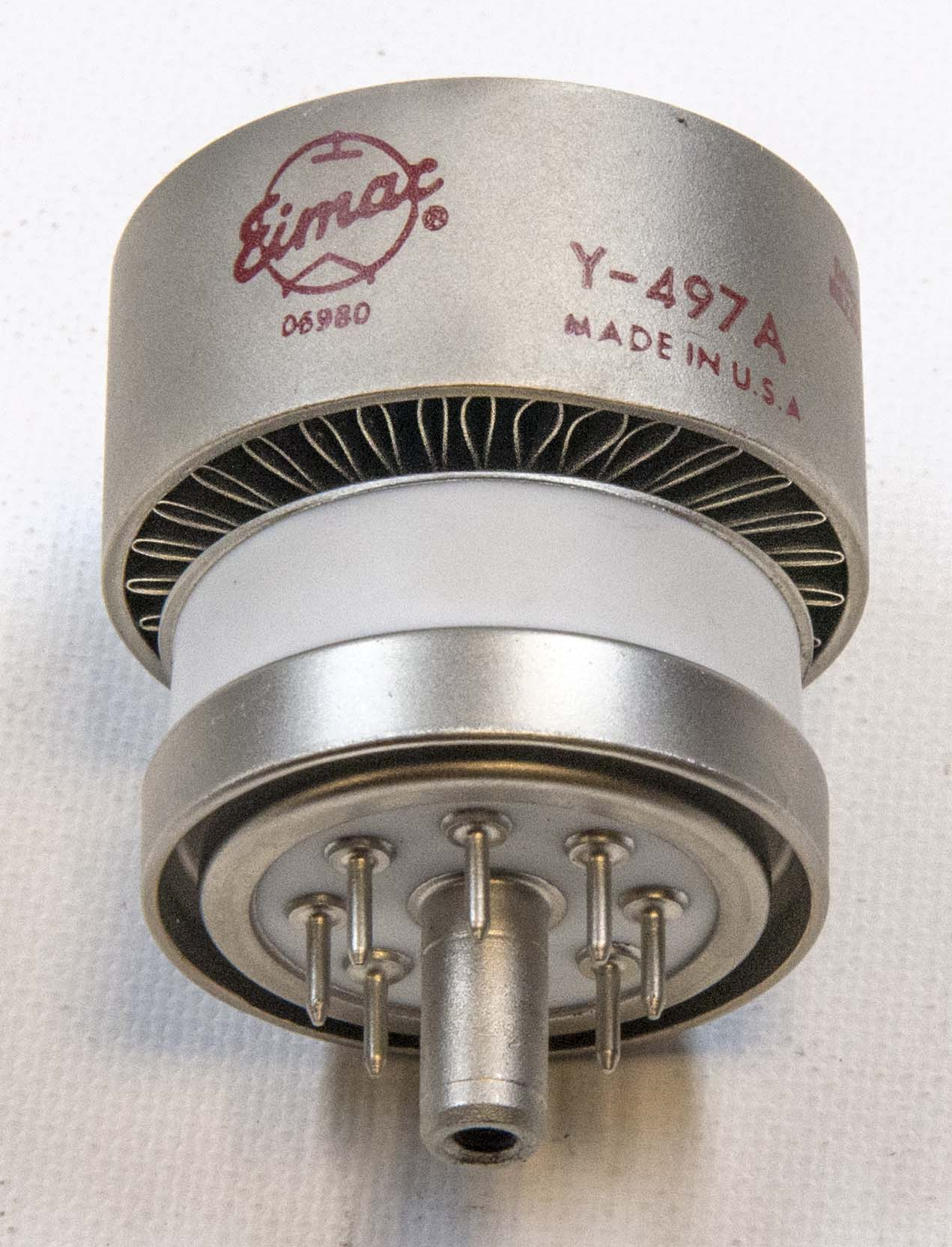
Radial beam power tetrode, designed for radio frequency use. This type of beam power tube does not use beam confining plates.

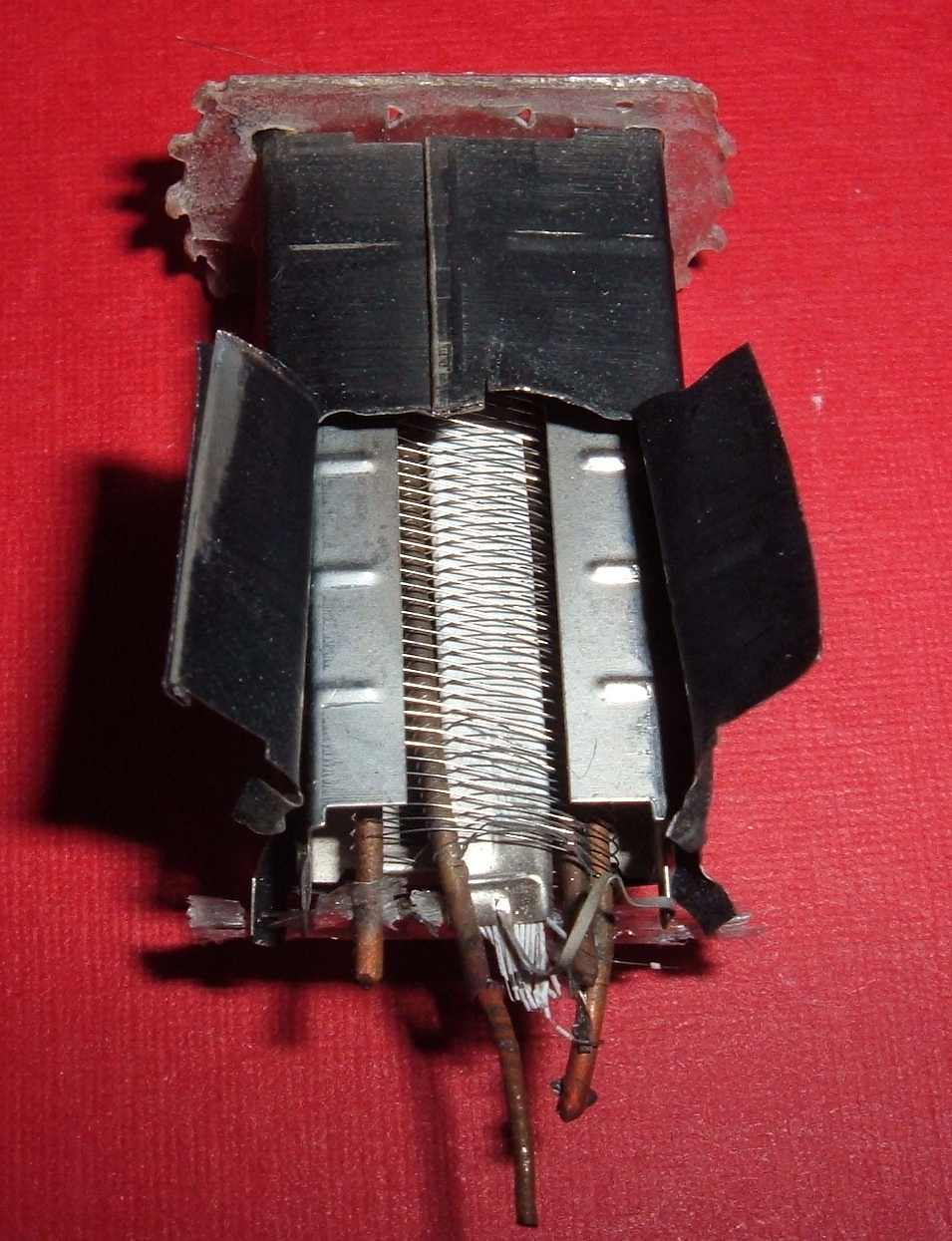
6L6 type beam tetrode electrode structures with anode cut open. The beam confining plates are the silver coloured structures to the left and right

Comparison of anode characteristic of beam power tube and power pentode

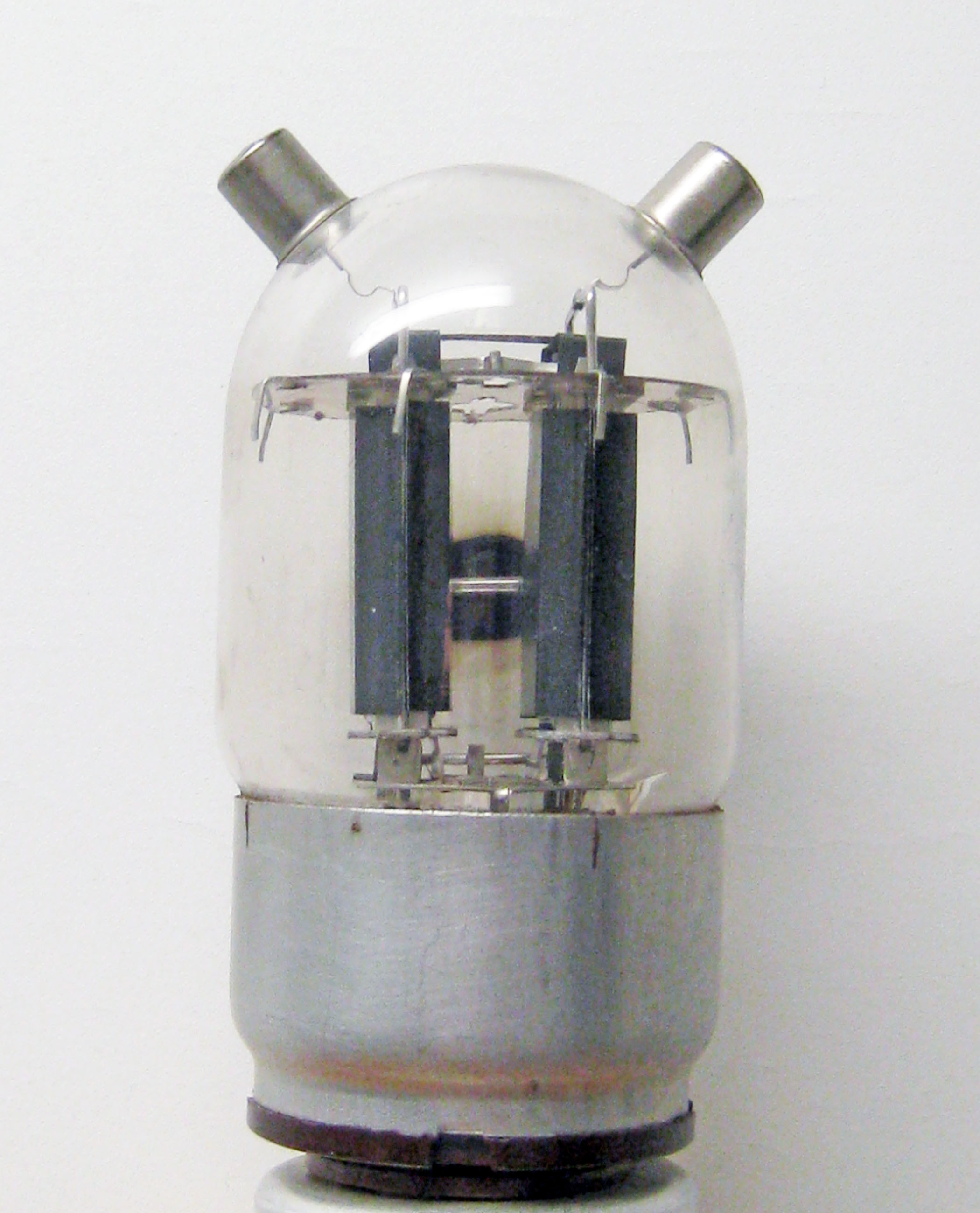
Twin beam tetrode RCA-815, used as the bias oscillator tube in the Ampex Model 300 "bathtub" 1/4" full-track professional audio tape recorder

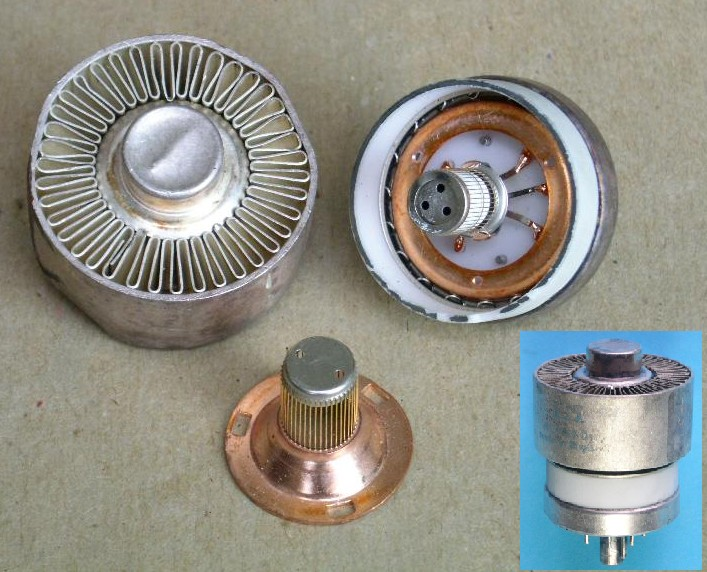
Internal Construction of 4CX250B radial beam power tetrode. Anode structure with attached cooling fins top left, cathode and control grid structure top right, screen grid bottom. Note absence of beam plates, cylindrical symmetry, and slotted screw holes, allowing alignment of the screen grid during manufacture.Inset: Complete valve.

A beam tetrode, sometimes called a beam power tube, is a type of vacuum tube or thermionic valve that has two grids and forms the electron stream from the cathode into multiple partially collimated beams to produce a low potential space charge region between the anode and screen grid to return anode secondary emission electrons to the anode when the anode potential is less than that of the screen grid. Beam tetrodes are usually used for power amplification, from audio frequency to radio frequency. The beam tetrode produces greater output power than a triode or pentode with the same anode supply voltage. The first beam tetrode marketed was the Marconi N40, introduced in 1935. Beam tetrodes manufactured and used in the 21st century include the 4CX250B, KT66 and variants of the 6L6.

== History ==
In amplifier circuits, the useful anode voltage - anode current region of operation of the conventional tetrode tube was limited by the detrimental effect of secondary emission from the anode at anode potentials less than that of the screen grid. The detrimental effect of anode secondary emission was solved by Philips/Mullard with the introduction of a suppressor grid, which resulted in the pentode design. Since Philips held a patent on this design, other manufacturers were keen to produce pentode type tubes without infringing the patent. In the UK, three EMI engineers (Isaac Shoenberg, Cabot Bull and Sidney Rodda) filed a patent on an alternative design in 1933. Their design had the following features (compared to the normal pentode):

- The apertures of the control and screen grids were aligned, by winding the grids with the same pitch (the grids of the pentode used different pitches).
- Greater distance between the screen grid and the anode than an ordinary tetrode or pentode.
- An auxiliary electrode structure at or near cathode potential and substantially outside of the electron stream, to establish a low electrostatic potential region between the screen grid and anode, limit the included angle of the beam and prevent anode secondary electrons outside of the beam region from reaching the screen (the pentode has a suppressor grid in the electron stream).

The design is today known as the beam tetrode but historically was also known as a kinkless tetrode, since it had the same number of grids as the conventional tetrode but without the negative resistance kink in the anode current vs anode voltage characteristic curves of a true tetrode. Some authors, notably outside the United Kingdom, argue that the beam plates constitute a fifth electrode.

The EMI design had the following advantages over the pentode:

- The design produced more output power than a similar power pentode.
- The transconductance was higher than a similar power pentode.
- The plate resistance was lower than a similar power pentode.
- The screen grid current was about 5–10% of the anode current compared with about 20% for the pentode, thus the beam tetrode was more power-efficient.
- The design produced less third-harmonic distortion in class A operation than a comparable power pentode.

The new tube was introduced at the Physical and Optical Societies' Exhibition in January 1935 as the Marconi N40. Around one thousand of the N40 output tetrodes were produced, but MOV (Marconi-Osram Valve) company, under the joint ownership of EMI and GEC, considered the design too difficult to manufacture due to the need for good alignment of the grid wires. As MOV had a design-share agreement with RCA of America, the design was passed to that company. RCA had the resources to produce a workable design, which resulted in the 6L6. Not long after, the beam tetrode appeared in a variety of offerings, including the 6V6 in December 1936, the MOV KT66 in 1937 and the KT88 in 1956, designed specifically for audio and highly prized by collectors today.

After the Philips patent on the suppressor grid had expired, many beam tetrodes were referred to as "beam power pentodes". In addition, there were some examples of beam tetrodes designed to work in place of pentodes. The ubiquitous EL34, although manufactured by Mullard/Philips and other European manufacturers as a true pentode, was also produced by other manufacturers (namely GE, Sylvania, and MOV) as a beam tetrode instead. The 6CA7 as manufactured by Sylvania and GE is a beam tetrode drop-in replacement for an EL34, and the KT77 is a similar design to the 6CA7 made by MOV.

A beam tetrode family widely used in the US comprised the 25L6, 35L6, and 50L6, and their miniature versions the 50B5 and 50C5. This family is not to be confused with the 6L6 despite similar designations. They were used in millions of All American Five AM radio receivers. Most of these used a transformerless power supply circuit. In American radio receivers with transformer power supplies, built from about 1940–1950, the 6V6, 6V6G, 6V6GT and miniature 6AQ5 beam tetrodes were very commonly used.

In military equipment, the 807 and 1625, with rated anode dissipations of 25 watts and operating from a supply of up to 750 volts, were in widespread use as the final amplifier in radio-frequency transmitters of up to 50 watts output power and in push-pull applications for audio. These tubes were very similar to a 6L6 but had a somewhat higher anode dissipation rating and the anode was connected to the top cap instead of a pin at the base. Large numbers entered the market after World War II and were used widely by radio amateurs in the USA and Europe through the 1950s and 1960s.

In the 1950s, the ultra-linear audio amplifier circuit was developed for beam tetrodes. This amplifier circuit links the screen grids to taps on the output transformer, and provides reduced intermodulation distortion.

== Operation ==
The beam tetrode eliminates the dynatron region or tetrode kink of the screen grid tube by developing a low potential space charge region between the screen grid and anode that returns anode secondary emission electrons to the anode. The anode characteristic of the beam tetrode is less rounded at lower anode voltages than that of the power pentode, resulting in greater power output and less third harmonic distortion with the same anode supply voltage.

In beam tetrodes, the apertures of the control grid and the screen grid are aligned. The wires of the screen grid are aligned with those of the control grid so that the screen grid lies in the shadow of the control grid. This reduces the screen grid current, contributing to the tube's greater power conversion efficiency. Alignment of the grid apertures concentrates the electrons into dense beams in the space between the screen grid and the anode, permitting the anode to be placed closer to the screen grid than would be possible without the beam density. The intense negative space charge of these beams developed when the anode potential is less than that of the screen grid prevents secondary electrons from the anode from reaching the screen grid.

In receiving type beam tetrodes, beam confining plates are introduced outside of the beam region to constrain the electron beams to certain sectors of the anode which are sections of a cylinder. These beam confining plates also set up a low electrostatic potential region between the screen grid and anode and return anode secondary electrons from outside of the beam region to the anode.

In beam tetrodes that have complete cylindrical symmetry, a kinkless characteristic can be achieved without the need for beam confining plates. This form of construction is usually adopted in larger tubes with an anode power rating of 100W or more. The Eimac 4CX250B (rated at 250W anode dissipation) is an example of this class of beam tetrode. Note that a radically different approach is taken to the design of the support system for the electrodes in these types. The 4CX250B is described by its manufacturer as a 'radial beam power tetrode, drawing attention to the symmetry of its electrode system.

Beam tetrode application circuits often include components to prevent spurious oscillation, suppress transient voltages and smooth out frequency response. In radio frequency applications, shielding is required between the plate circuit components and grid circuit components.

== Dissection of a beam tetrode ==
Parts of a small receiving-type beam tetrode	Pictures
The glass envelope has been removed. View of the tube base, anode or plate and getter pan. The anode is the large, gray colored, cylindrical structure. The getter pan is the cup-shaped part at the top. The getter is a powdered metal (Barium) that reacts strongly to oxygen. After the tube is sealed, the getter pan is inductively heated to vaporize the getter, which is deposited on the inside of the glass envelope.	
Half of the anode has been removed. The two mica discs that support the electrodes at the top and bottom can be seen. The tall, vertically oriented, silver colored electrode on the left is one of the beam confining or beam forming plates. The screen grid is inside of the beam confining plates.	
The anode has been removed completely. The beam confining plates can be seen to the right and left of the grids. The screen grid is the outermost grid. Between the screen grid and the cathode is the control grid.	
The beam confining plates have been removed.	
The getter pan, getter pan supports and the upper mica disc have been removed. The elliptical helix of the screen grid surrounds the control grid. The screen grid support rods are on the left and right outside of the control grid support rods.	
The screen grid and its support rods have been removed. The elliptical helix of the control grid surrounds the cathode; the control grid support rods are on the left and right of the cathode.	
The control grid and its support rods have been removed. The indirectly heated cathode surrounds the heater. The electron emitting portion of the cathode is the white-colored oxide coating, typically barium oxide or strontium oxide.	
The cathode has been removed. The heater is tungsten wire coated with a refractory dielectric material of high thermal conductivity.	
