= Marconi-Osram Valve =

M-OV (Marconi-Osram Valve Company) was a British manufacturer of thermionic valves (vacuum tubes). It was a subsidiary of the (British) General Electric Company Ltd. It was named after the Marconi Company and Osram, which were two major manufacturers of the tube.

== History ==
The company was founded in 1919, when the valve making interests of GEC (Osram) and the Marconi Company were combined. In 1929, Marconi sold its interest in the company to the Gramophone Company, a predecessor of EMI.

In 1939, M-OV acquired two disused cotton mills at Shaw, Oldham where it established a shadow factory to produce valves and cathode ray tubes. The two mills named Cape and Duke, were bought from the Lancashire Cotton Corporation for £7,000. Cape mill was used as the main production facility at Shaw, with the adjacent Duke mill remaining mostly unused.

Shaw produced a vast array of valves for the war effort, some of which are listed below.

- VT104 and VT105 for the T1154 transmitter.
- VR99, VR100, VR101 and VR103 for the R1155 receiver.
- TT11 for the TR1143 fighter set.
- VT90 micropup used in airborne radar.

EMI sold its share of M-OV to GEC in 1956. The company continued to manufacture valves at the Brook Green Works, Hammersmith, London, until 1988. M-OV branded new old stock valves, continue to be highly prized by enthusiasts of the valve sound.

Notable products of the company included cathode ray tubes for television, starting in the 1930s. The company also introduced the KT66 "kinkless tetrode" (beam power tetrode). In 1922 the company brought out valves using thoriated tungsten filaments, which needed less battery power to operate than former types. During World War II the company developed the CV122 valve used in the proximity fuse.

== Bibliography ==
- Barry Vyse & George Robert Jessop, The Saga of Marconi-Osram Valve: A History of Valve-making at One of the World's Foremost Enterprises, Vyse Ltd, 2000 ISBN 0-9539127-0-1
