= New old stock =

Concept in inventory

New old stock (NOS), or old stock for short, refers to aged stock of merchandise that was never sold to a customer and is still new in original packaging. Such merchandise may not be manufactured anymore, and the new old stock may represent the only current source of a particular item. There is no consensus on how old a product must be to be NOS, and some people reserve an NOS label only for products that are actually discontinued.

Although not an officially recognized accounting term, it is in common use in the auction and retail industries. For example, owners of classic, vintage, and antique vehicles or other machines seek NOS parts that are needed to keep their bicycles, automobiles, motorcycles, trucks or timepieces operational, or in factory-original condition. These owners put a premium on NOS parts.

Another definition of NOS is new original stock, referring to aged original equipment parts that remained in unsold inventory. This inventory may sell at a premium in a vintage or collectables market, such as among antique vehicle collectors where enthusiasts seek to repair their vehicles with original parts.

== See also ==
- Do-it-yourself
- Mint condition
- Original equipment manufacturer
