= 6L6 =

Vacuum tube

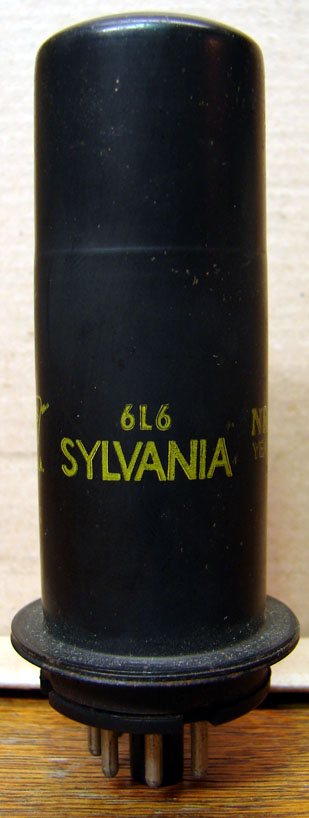
- A 6L6 tube manufactured by Sylvania
- Classification: Beam power tetrode
- Service: Class-A amplifier, class-B amplifier, class-AB amplifier, (audio amplifiers)
- Height: 4.25 in (108 mm)
- Diameter: 1.438 in (36.5 mm)

Cathode
- Cathode type: Indirectly heated
- Heater voltage: 6.3
- Heater current: 900 mA

Anode
- Max dissipation Watts: 30
- Max voltage: 500; Specification listed is for type 6L6-GC

Socket connections
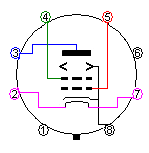
- The 6L6 Pinout, metal versions had the shell connected to pin 1 Pin 1 – n.c Pin 2 – Heater; Pin 3 – Anode (Plate); Pin 4 – Grid 2 (Screen); Pin 5 – Grid 1 (control); Pin 6 – n.c Pin 7 – Heater Pin 8 – Cathode & beam-forming plates

Typical class-A amplifier operation
- Anode voltage: 350 V
- Anode current: 54 mA
- Screen voltage: 250 V
- Bias voltage: −18 V
- Anode resistance: 5 kOhms

Typical class-AB amplifier operation (Values are for two tubes)
- Power output: 55 W
- Anode resistance: (anode to anode): 5.6 kOhms
- Anode voltage: 450 V
- Anode current: 2*54 mA
- Screen voltage: 400 V
- Bias voltage: −37 V

References
- Essential Characteristics, General Electric, 1973

6L6 is the designator for a beam power tube introduced by Radio Corporation of America in April 1936 and marketed for application as a power amplifier for audio frequencies. The 6L6 is a beam tetrode that utilizes formation of a low potential space charge region between the anode and screen grid to return anode secondary emission electrons to the anode and offers significant performance improvements over power pentodes. The 6L6 was the first successful beam power tube marketed. In the 21st century, variants of the 6L6 are manufactured and used in some high fidelity audio amplifiers and musical instrument amplifiers.

== History ==
In the UK, three engineers at EMI (Isaac Shoenberg, Cabot Bull and Sidney Rodda) had developed and filed patents in 1933 and 1934 on an output tetrode that utilized novel electrode structures to form electron beams to create a dense space charge region between the anode and screen grid to return anode secondary electrons to the anode. The new tube offered improved performance compared to a similar power pentode and was introduced at the Physical and Optical Societies' Exhibition in January 1935 as the Marconi N40. Around one thousand of the N40 output tetrodes were produced, but MOV (Marconi-Osram Valve) company, under the joint ownership of EMI and GEC, considered the design too difficult to manufacture due to the need for good alignment of the grid wires. As MOV had a design-share agreement with RCA of America, the design was passed to that company.

Top view cross-section showing typical 6L6 type electrode structures and beam formation

The metal tube technology utilized for the 6L6 had been developed by General Electric and introduced in April 1935, with RCA manufacturing the metal envelope tubes for GE at that time. Some of the advantages of metal tube construction over glass envelope tubes were smaller size, ruggedness, electromagnetic shielding and smaller interelectrode capacitance. The 6L6 incorporated an octal base, which had been introduced with the GE metal tubes. The 6L6 was rated for 3.5 watts screen power dissipation and 24 watts combined plate and screen dissipation. The 6L6 and variants of it became popular for use in public address amplifiers, musical instrument amplifiers, radio frequency applications and audio stages of radio transmitters. The 6L6 family has had one of the longest active lifetimes of any electronic component, more than 80 years. As of 2021, variants of the 6L6 are manufactured in Russia, China, and Slovakia.

== Variations ==
The voltage and power ratings of the 6L6 series were gradually pushed upwards by such features as thicker plates, grids of larger diameter wire, grid cooling fins, ultra-black plate coatings and low loss materials for the base. Variants of the 6L6 included the 6L6G, 6L6GX, 6L6GA, 6L6GAY, 6L6GB, 5932/6L6WGA and the 6L6GC. All variants after the original 6L6 utilized glass envelopes. A "W" in the descriptor identified the tube as designed to withstand greater vibration and impact. A "Y" in the descriptor indicated that the insulating material of the base was Micanol.

== Application ==
The high transconductance and high plate resistance of the 6L6 requires circuit design that incorporates topologies and components that smooth out the frequency response, suppress voltage transients and prevent spurious oscillation.

== Characteristics ==
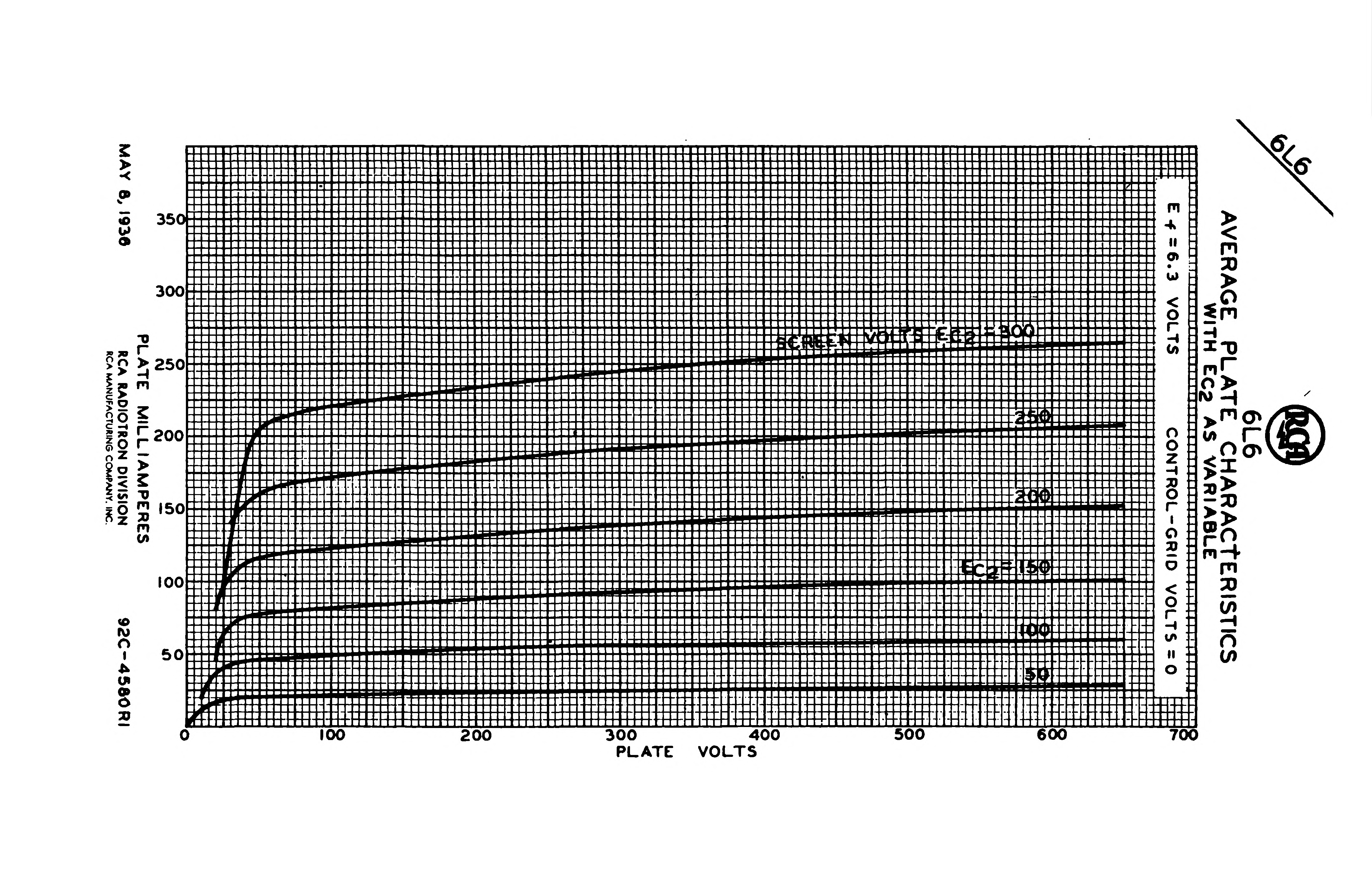
Anode characteristics with screen grid (grid 2) voltage as parameter

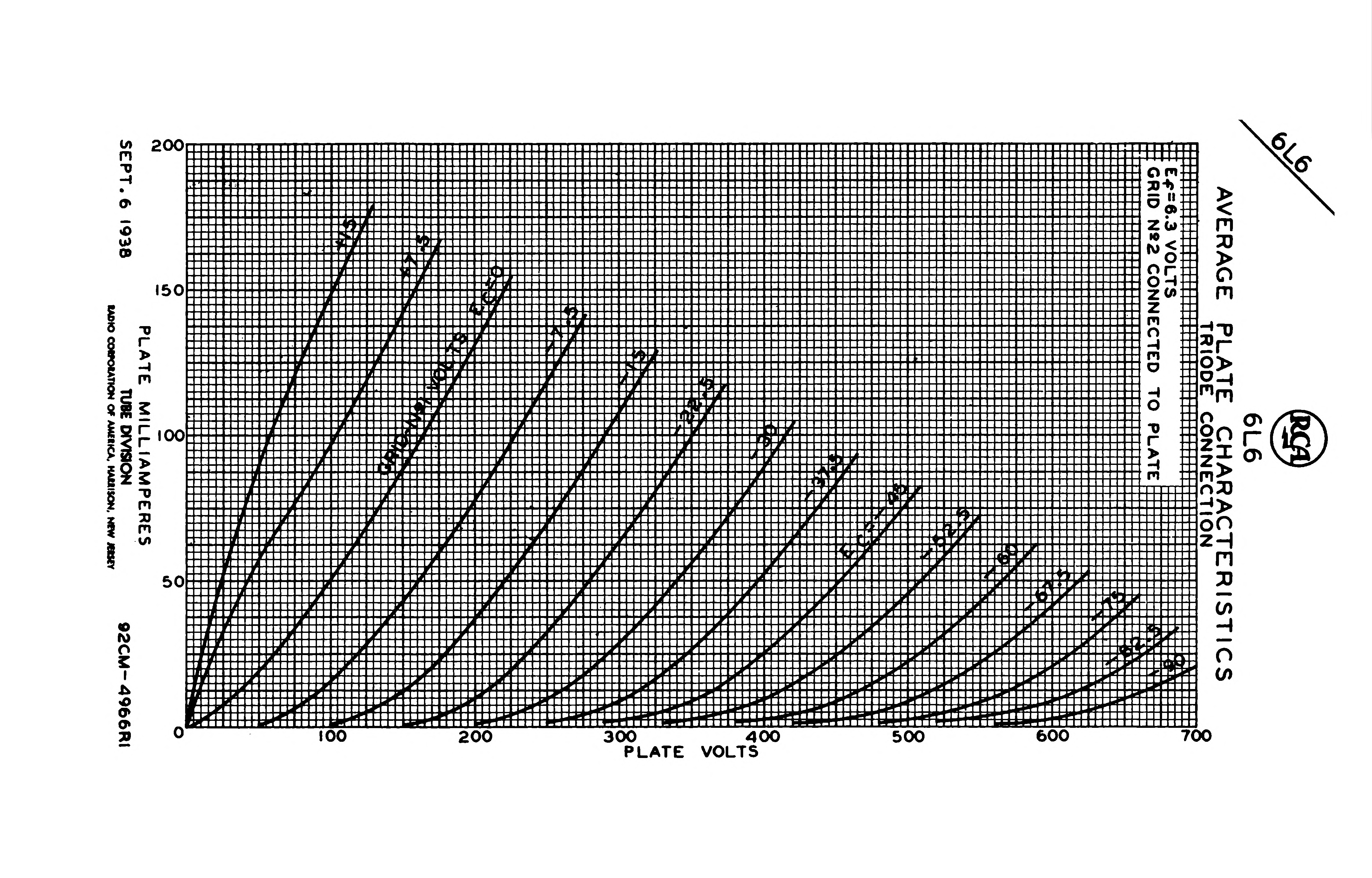
Anode characteristics with the screen grid (grid 2) connected to the anode (i.e. used as a triode)

== Improved substitute ==
- 5881

== Similar tubes ==
- 6P3S (6П3С)
- 6P3S-E (6П3С-E)
- 7027a
- 6BG6

== See also ==
- 6V6
- KT66
- KT88
- 6550
- 6CA7
- EL34
- List of vacuum tubes
