= KT66 =

Audio frequency beam tetrode

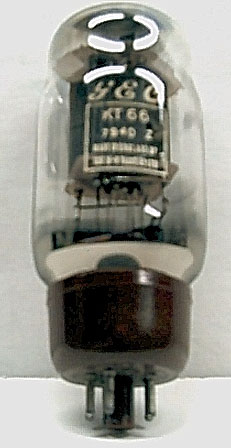
- Original G.E.C./M.O.V. KT66 Beam-Power Tetrode tube; this is an example from late production
- Classification: Beam-Power Tetrode
- Service: Class-A amplifier, (single-ended); Class-AB amplifier, (push–pull)

Cathode
- Cathode type: Indirectly heated
- Heater voltage: 6.3
- Heater current: 1.27A

Anode
- Max dissipation Watts: 25
- Max voltage: 500

Socket connections
- Octal Base, (IO): Pin 1, Not Used; Pin 2, Heater; Pin-3, Anode/Plate; Pin-4, Screen Grid, g2; Pin-5, Control Grid, g1; Pin-6, Not Used; Pin-7, Heater; Pin-8, Cathode-Beam Plates

Typical class-A amplifier operation
- Anode voltage: 250
- Anode current: 85mA
- Screen voltage: 250
- Bias voltage: −15
- Anode resistance: 22K Ohms

Typical class-AB amplifier operation (Values are for two tubes)
- Anode voltage: 400
- Anode current: 62.5mA (Includes Screen Current)
- Screen voltage: 400
- Bias voltage: −38, (Class AB1)

References
- Super Radiotron Valve Manual, Amalgamated Wireless Valve Co. Australia, June 1962; Radio Valve Data, Eighth Ed. Ilife Books Ltd., London, 1966

KT66 is the designator for a beam power tube introduced by Marconi-Osram Valve Co. Ltd. (M-OV) of Britain in 1937 and marketed for application as a power amplifier for audio frequencies and driver for radio frequencies. The KT66 is a beam tetrode that utilizes partially collimated electron beams to form a low potential space charge region between the anode and screen grid to return anode secondary emission electrons to the anode and offers significant performance improvements over comparable power pentodes. In the 21st century, the KT66 is manufactured and used in some high fidelity audio amplifiers and musical instrument amplifiers.

== Overview ==
Although the RCA 6L6 of 1936 (the result of a license agreement between RCA and EMI) was the first successful beam power tube on the market, the KT66 of 1937 became almost equally famous, at least in Europe.

Because the beam tetrode design eliminated the tetrode kink in the lower parts of the tetrode's voltage-current characteristic curves, M-OV marketed this tube family as the "KT" series, standing for kinkless tetrode.

The KT66 was one of the "International series" introduced in 1937. This series utilized the "American Octal" base and had characteristics equivalent to tubes by U.S. manufacturers. A number of different KT tubes were later marketed by M-OV. Some, but not all, were versions of existing American beam tetrode tubes or European power pentodes, such as the KT66 (6L6GC similar), KT77 (EL34 and 6CA7 similar), KT88 (6550), and KT63 (6F6, pentode but almost identical characteristics).

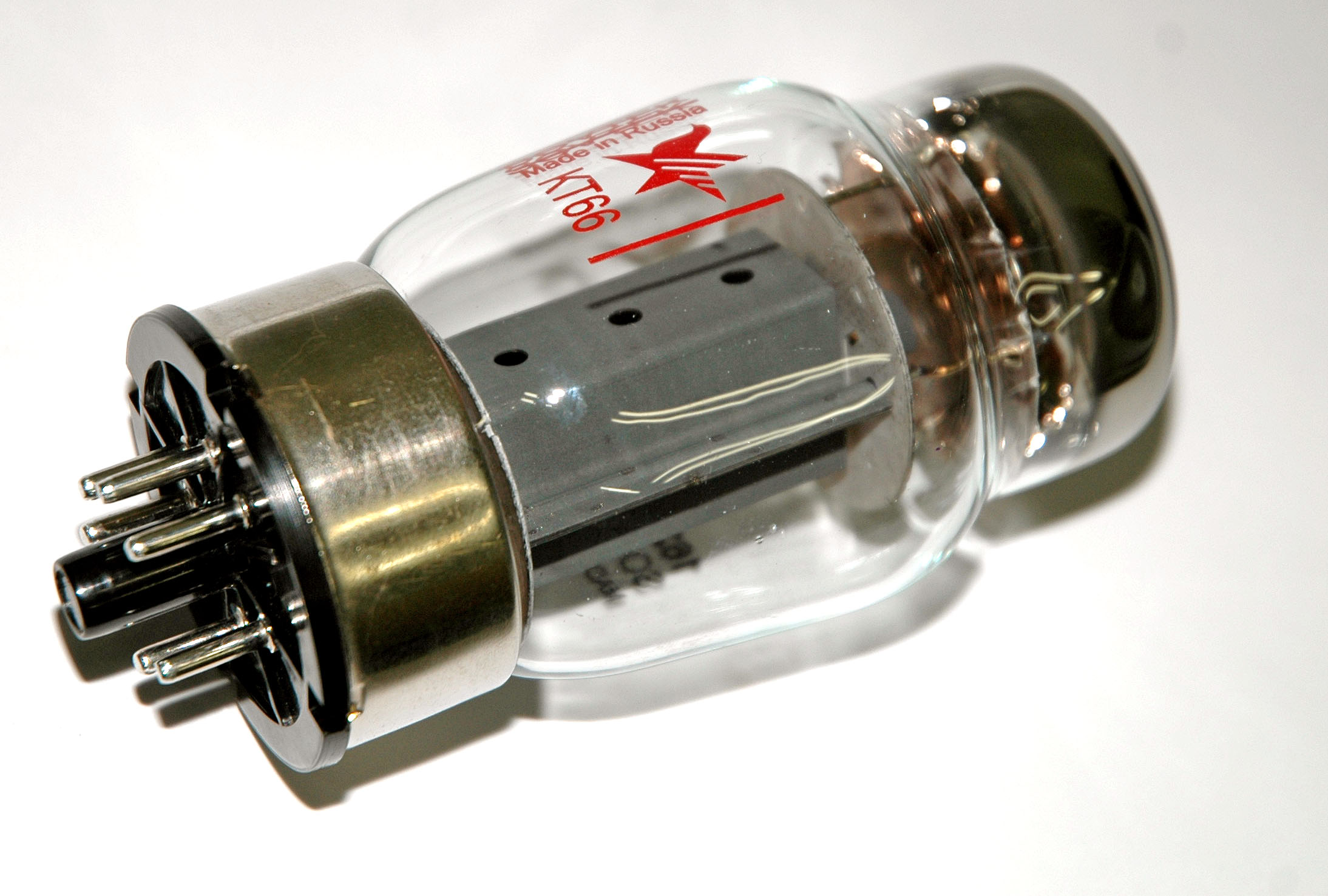

The KT66 was very popular in British radios and audio amplifiers. It was the standard output tube in the classic Quad II (1952, a version of which is still being manufactured today) and in the LEAK Type 15 (1945) and TL/12 (1948), both among the earliest British hi-fi amplifiers. Because of their excellent electrical characteristics and overload tolerance, KT66s are preferred by some guitar players for use in guitar amps in place of 6L6GC. However, the plate dissipation of the 6L6GC, at 30W, exceeds the KT66's 25W, and adjustment of the amplifier's bias is necessary.

M-OV ceased glass vacuum tube manufacturing in 1988; their old audio tube types became valuable collectibles. In 2004 original M-OV KT66 tubes (bearing the official "Genalex" marketing brand that M-OV used outside the UK), unused in original carton, sold for US$250. As of 2022 KT66 tubes continued to be manufactured at EkspoPUL in Saratov, Russia (Genalex Gold Lion brand), JJ Electronic in Slovakia, and by Hengyang Electronics at former Guiguang factory in Foshan city, southern China.

Some modern Russian manufacture Sovtek KT66 tubes are actually 6L6GC tubes in a KT66 style bottle. While these tubes have the same pinout and minimum tolerances required of a KT66 tube, they do not have the performance characteristics of a true kinkless tetrode KT66 tube.

By contrast the very latest Russian manufactured tubes (2012) not only carry the same internal electrode structure as the original KT66 (they now look the same) they also have the same rugged electrical characteristics and can withstand a high voltage on grid 2 comparable to the anode voltage rating, allowing greater power output afforded by higher voltage capability when run in ultralinear connection.

== See also ==
- KT88
- 6L6
- 6CA7 / EL34
- 6V6
- 807
