= EL34 =

Vacuum tube (valve)

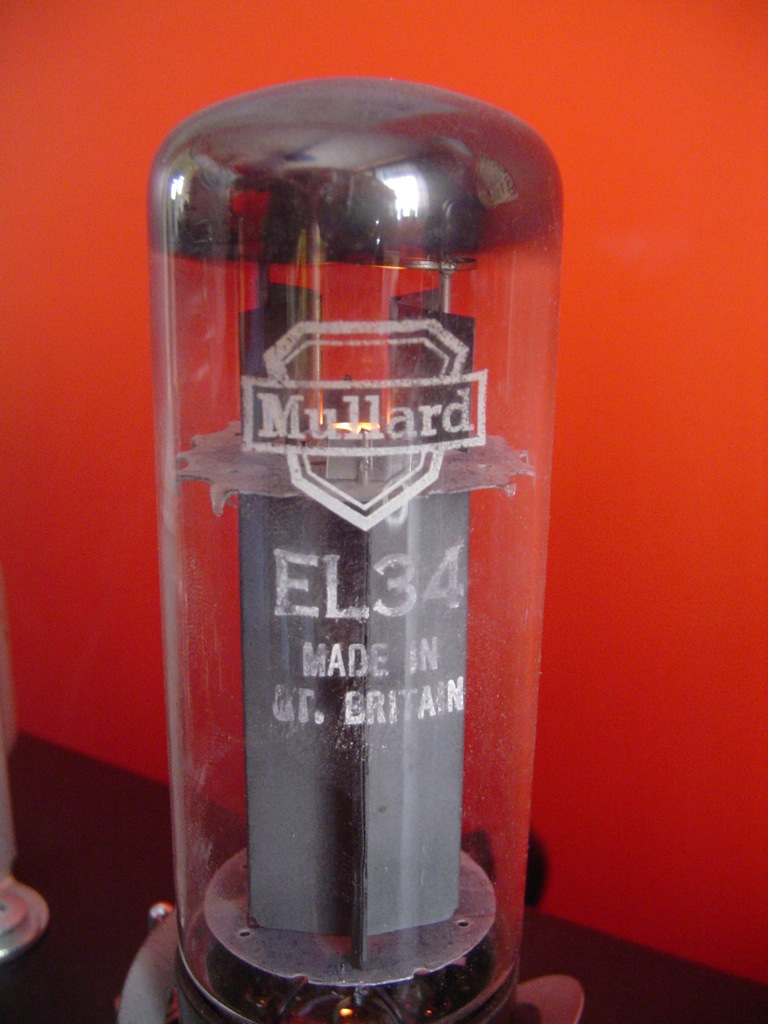
- An EL34 vacuum tube manufactured by Mullard
- Classification: Pentode
- Service: class-A amplifier, class-AB amplifier, class-B amplifier, (audio amplifiers)
- Height: 4.44 in (113 mm)
- Diameter: 1.5 in (38 mm)

Cathode
- Cathode type: Indirectly heated
- Heater voltage: 6.3
- Heater current: 1.5 A

Anode
- Max dissipation Watts: 25
- Max voltage: 800

Socket connections
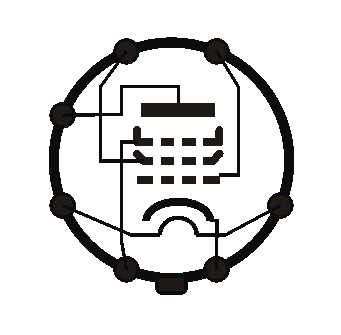

Typical class-A amplifier operation
- Amplification factor: 11
- Anode voltage: 265 V
- Anode current: 100 mA
- Screen voltage: 250 V
- Bias voltage: −13.5 V
- Anode resistance: 2 k Ohms

Typical class-AB amplifier operation (Values are for two tubes)
- Power output: 55 W
- Anode resistance: (anode to anode): 3.4 k Ohms
- Anode voltage: 420 V
- Anode current: 2* 120 mA
- Screen voltage: 375 V
- Bias voltage: −38 V

References
- Tung-Sol 6CA7 (EL34 Substitute) Vacuum Tube Logic Book 2nd Edition, 1994, page 151

The EL34 is a thermionic vacuum tube of the power pentode type. The EL34 was introduced in 1955 by Mullard, which was owned by Philips. The EL34 has an octal base (indicated by the '3' in the part number) and is found mainly in the final output stages of audio amplification circuits; it was also designed to be suitable as a series regulator by virtue of its high permissible voltage between heater and cathode and other parameters. The American RETMA tube designation number for this tube is 6CA7. The USSR analog was 6P27S (Cyrillic: 6П27C).

== Specifications ==
In common with all 'E' prefix tubes, using the Mullard–Philips tube designation, the EL34 has a heater voltage of 6.3 V. According to the data sheets found in old vacuum tube reference manuals, a pair of EL34s with 800 V plate voltage can produce 90 watts output in class AB1 in push–pull configuration. However, this configuration is rarely found. One application of this type was in "Australian Sound" public address amplifiers commonly used in government schools in Australia in the 1950s, using four EL34s for ≈200 watts. More commonly found is a pair of EL34s running class AB1 in push–pull around 375–450 V plate voltage and producing 50 watts output (if fixed bias is used), while a quad of EL34s running class AB1 in push–pull typically run anywhere from 425 to 500 V plate voltage and produces 100 watts output. This configuration is typically found in guitar amplifiers.

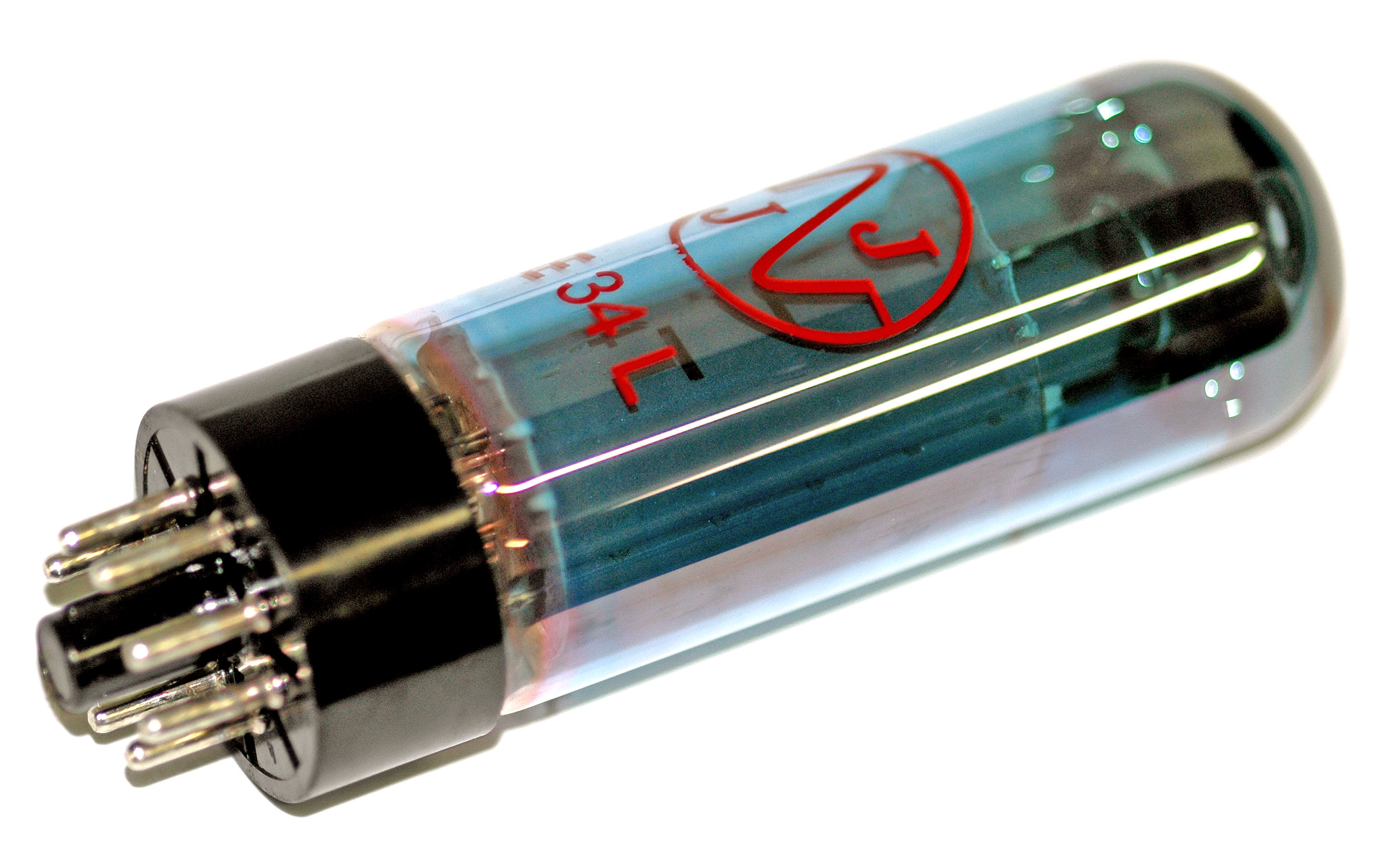
An E34L made by JJ Electronics c.2011, using blue glass

The EL34 is a pentode, while the 6L6, which delivers a similar range of power output, is a beam tetrode which RCA referred to as a beam power tube. Although power pentodes and beam tetrodes have some differences in their principles of operation (the beam forming plates of the beam tetrode or fifth electrode (3rd grid) of the pentode, both serving to hinder the return of unabsorbed electrons from the anode (or plate) to the 4th electrode (2nd grid)) and have some internal construction differences, they are functionally closely equivalent. Unlike the 6L6, (EIA base 7AC) the EL34 has its grid 3 connection brought out to a separate Pin (Pin 1) (EIA base 8ET) and its heater draws 1.5 Amps compared to the 0.9 Amp heater in the 6L6. However, Sylvania (and possibly GE) marketed a tube as 6CA7 which was not only in a markedly different 'fat boy' envelope, but used a beam forming plate much like a 6L6. Examining the mica spacer on the top of the tube will confirm the lack of a suppressor grid. Although these tubes have similar (but not identical) characteristics, they are made very differently.

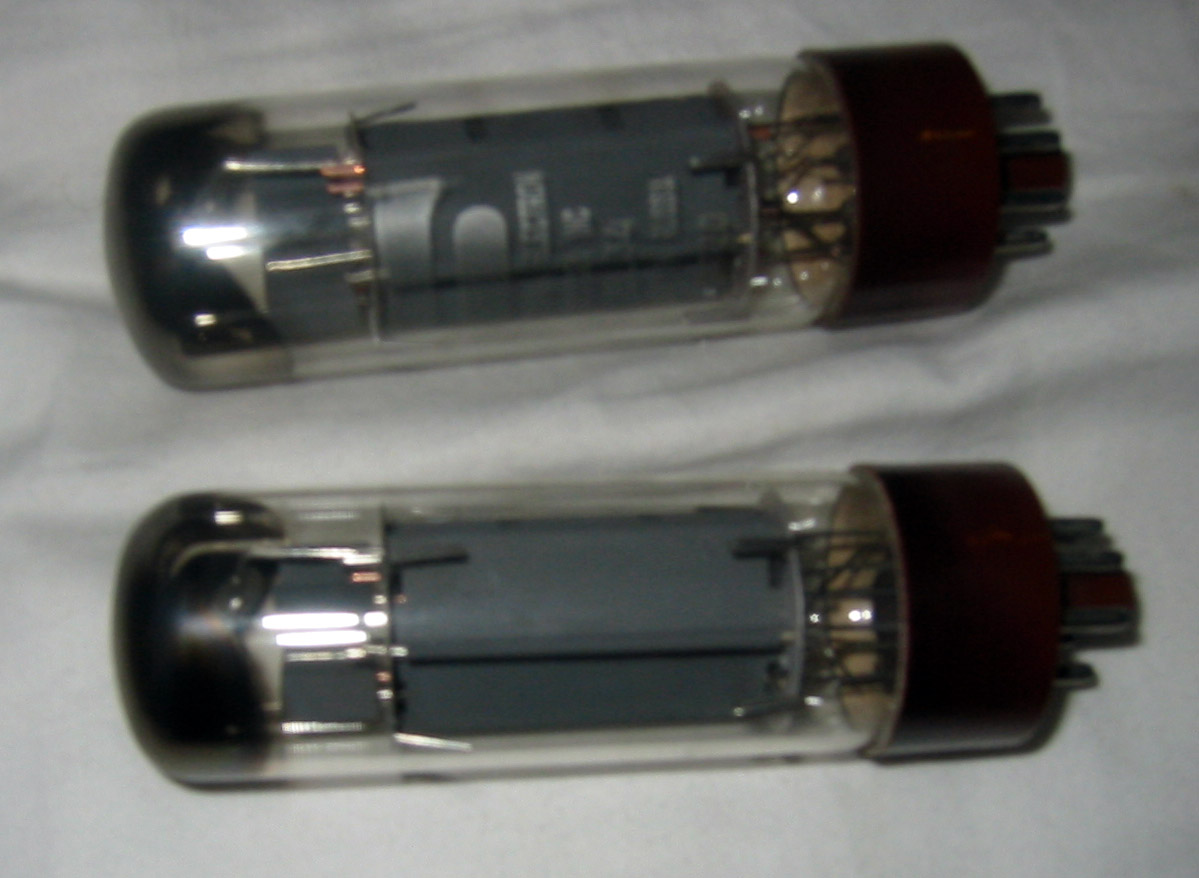
Matched EL34 vacuum tubes by Russian manufacturer Svetlana

While the EL34 is no longer made by Philips, it is currently manufactured by EkspoPUL in Saratov, Russia (Electro-Harmonix, Tung-Sol, Mullard and Genalex Gold Lion brands), JJ Electronic in Čadca, Slovakia and by Hengyang Electronics at former Foshan Nanhai Guiguang Electron Tube Factory in southern China, (Psvane and TAD brands).

Some firms make a related tube called an E34L which is rated to require a higher grid bias voltage, but which may be interchangeable in some equipment.

== Application ==
The EL34 was widely used in higher-powered audio amplifiers of the 1960s and 1970s, such as the popular Dynaco Stereo 70 and the Leak TL25 (mono) and Stereo 60, and is also widely used in high-end guitar amplifiers because it is characterized by greater distortion (considered desirable in this application) at lower power than other octal tubes such as 6L6, KT88, or 6550. The EL34 is found in many British guitar amps and is associated with the "British tone" (Vox, Marshall, Hiwatt, Orange) as compared to the 6L6 which is generally associated with the "American tone" (Fender/Mesa Boogie; the earlier classic Marshall "Plexi" amps used the KT66, a beam tetrode similar to the 6L6, as well).

== Replacement ==
- 6CA7

== Similar tubes ==
- KT77
- 6P27S (6П27С)

== See also ==
- EL84
- 6V6
- 6L6
- 5881
- KT66
- KT88
- 6550
- List of vacuum tubes
