= Gibson Falcon =

Guitar amplifier

The Falcon (GA-19RVT) was a guitar amplifier made by Gibson Guitar Corporation in 1961. With the Falcon and a few other models, Gibson was ahead of Fender in bringing an amplifier with reverb on the market. In addition, the Falcon also had tremolo.

The Falcon got 14 watts out of two 6V6 tubes (the same tubes used in the comparable Fender Deluxe), and had a Jensen 12" speaker. The pre-amp was powered by three 6EU7 tubes, and a 7199 for the reverb circuit. It also has a 5V3GT rectifier tube in the V7 socket. Unlike Fender's later reverb amps (such as the Princeton Reverb), the Falcon had a fairly unusual placement of the reverb circuit: rather than being placed after the pre-amp section and having the wet signal mixed with the dry, the Falcon's reverb circuit taps the signal before the volume and tone control, and mixes it with the dry signal via independent volume controls. In addition, the Falcon had a separate monitor output at line level, to connect the amp to a separate "Regular Amplifier" (the Falcon being referred to in the brochures as "Reverb Amplifier") and create a stereo effect.

The Falcon's sound is described as "full, rich" and "sweet-sounding", with a "raw, gnarly, compressed tone" at higher volumes. It is relatively rare: according to Gibson's records 204 were sold in 1961; the next year, the Crestline design was introduced, involving a redesign of the control panel as well as the circuit.

There were three variants of the Crestline version of the Falcon, all with similar specs that lasted until 1965-1966. The next version of the Falcon, and the last tube version was released in 1967-1968. This last version was similar in specs to the previous versions but had different cosmetics, with a taller cabinet sporting a larger front mounted control panel with two rows of knobs. This version used 4x 12ax7, and 2x 6bq5 tubes, with a solid state rectifier. Few of this version were made. There was also a solid state version of the Falcon released in the early 1970s.
