= Georgy Khizha =

Russian politician and business manager

- Георгий Хижа

Deputy Prime Minister of Russia
- In office 20 May 1992 – 10 May 1993
- President: Boris Yeltsin
- Prime Minister: Boris Yeltsin; Yegor Gaidar (acting); Viktor Chernomyrdin

Personal details
- Born: Georgy Stepanovich Khizha; May 2, 1938 (age 88) Ashgabat, Turkmen Soviet Socialist Republic
- Profession: Factory manager

Georgy Stepanovich Khizha (Russian: Гео́ргий Степа́нович Хижа́; born 2 May 1938) is a Russian politician and business manager who was one of the Deputy Chairmen of the Government of the Russian Federation during the early years of President Boris Yeltsin's administration.

== Early work ==
A factory manager, Khizha was placed in charge of Svetlana in 1990. PJSC Svetlana (Russian: ПАО «Светлана») is a company based in Saint Petersburg, Russia. It is primarily involved in the research, design, and manufacturing of electronic and microelectronic instruments. Svetlana is part of Ruselectronics. The name of the company is said to originate from the words for 'light of an electric lamp' (световые лампочки накаливания). From 1991 to 1992, he served as that city's deputy mayor under Anatoly Sobchak, and proved to be a competent administrator.

== Career in government ==
In May 1992, Khizha was appointed the Deputy Chairman of the Government of the Russian Federation for the industrial sector, on recommendation to President Boris Yeltsin from Sobchak and Yegor Gaidar. Khizha was also apparently considered as an alternative for the post of acting Prime Minister of Russia, along with fellow vice premier Vladimir Shumeiko, as opposed to Yeltsin's nominee, Gaidar. He was regarded as being a conservative, and his appointment was viewed as a slowdown in economic reforms. During fighting between militants in North Ossetia, President Yeltsin appointed him as the acting governor of the region.

During this time, Martin Shakkum, later one of the candidates during the 1996 Russian presidential election, worked with Khizha as his adviser. Due to the negative economic effects of Khizha's proposals, he came into conflict with Anatoly Chubais, in charge of the country's economic policies. He was dismissed from his post in May 1993, lasting a little less than a year.

== Sources ==
=== Books ===
- Gaidar, Yegor (1999). Days of Defeat and Victory. University of Washington Press. ISBN 978-0295978239.
- Medvedev, Roy (2002). Post-Soviet Russia: A Journey Through the Yeltsin Era. Columbia University Press. ISBN 978-0231106078.
