= Fender Princeton =

Guitar amplifier produced by Fender

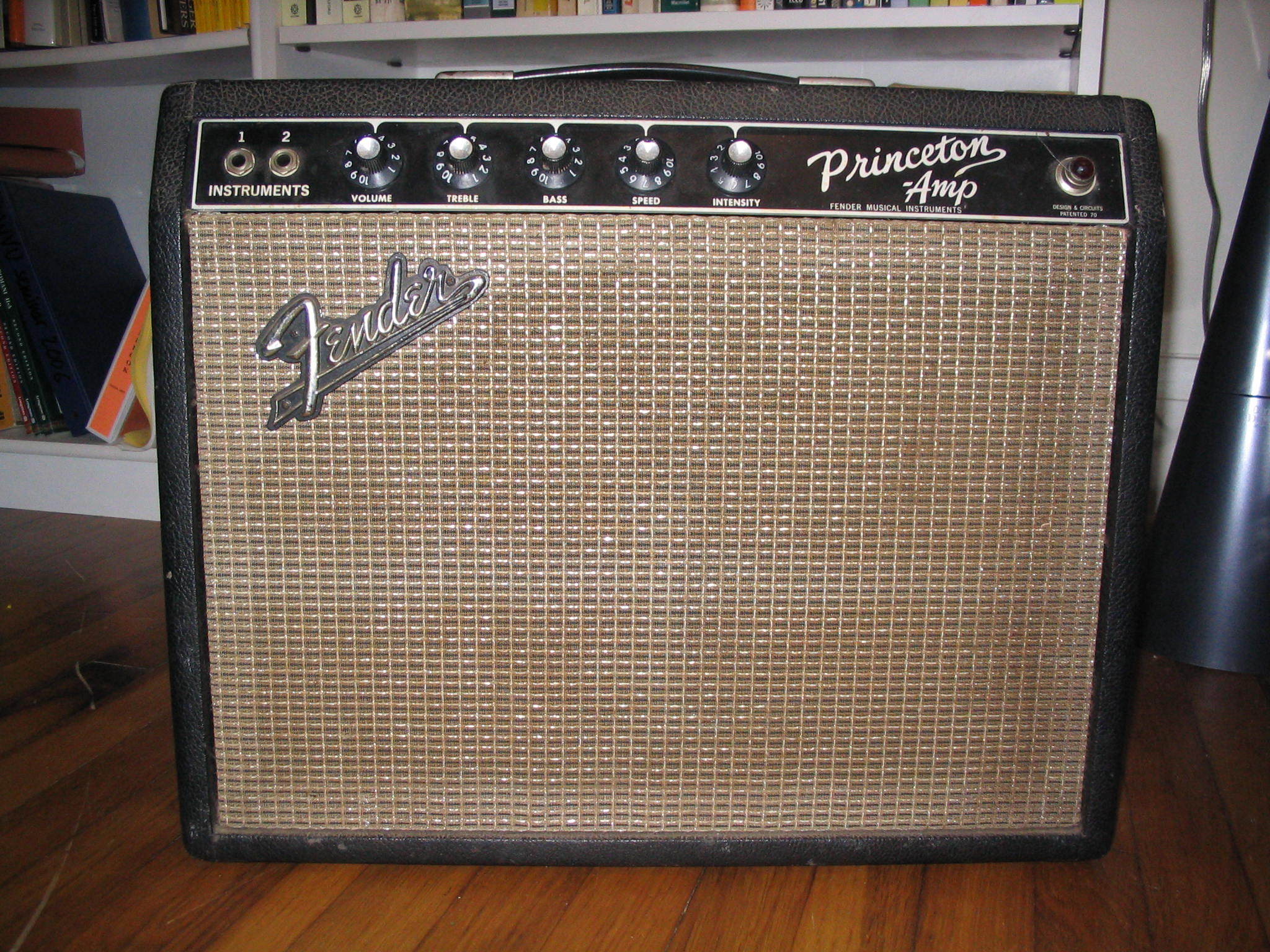
1966 Fender Princeton amplifier

The Fender Princeton is a guitar amplifier made by Fender. It was introduced in 1946 and discontinued in 1979. After Fender introduced the Champ Amp in 1948, the Princeton occupied the next to the bottom spot in the Fender line. Fender Princetons (as well as their sister amp the Princeton Reverb) from the early models into the 1970s «silverface» models are highly valued particularly as recording amplifiers.

The first Princeton, the "Woody" (so called for its uncovered wooden cabinet), was the smallest of the original Fender line of three amplifiers, an incredibly basic 3-watt practice amp with no controls at all, not even a power switch. The first widely produced Princeton, the 1948 tweed-covered "TV front," used one 6SL7 or 6SC7 dual-triode tube to provide two stages of RC-coupled voltage amplification in the preamplifier section; the power amplifier section used a single cathode-biased 6V6 beam power tetrode necessarily in Class A operation. The amplifier had a single volume control and a simple low-pass tone control to control treble response. The Princeton circuits up through 5C2 differed from the Fender Champ in having two versus one preamp stage (6SC7 dual-triode vs 6SJ7 pentode) and added the tone control that was absent in the Champs; the 12AX7-based Princeton models 5D2 through 5F2-A were essentially the Champ circuits 5D1 through 5F1 with a tone control and a somewhat larger output transformer. In 1956 the Princeton received a new cabinet roughly half again as tall and wide as the previous Champ-sized "small box."

In 1961, a new Princeton (6G2) of fundamentally different design was introduced, which instead of being essentially an upgraded Champ was more like a junior Deluxe. This "brownface" version used a single 7025 dual triode in the preamplifier; a 12AX7 dual triode, one half of which operated a tremolo oscillator and the other half of which served as a split-load phase inverter; and two 6V6GT tubes, which were fixed-biased in Class AB push-pull configuration in the power section. In 1964, the single tone control was replaced with individual bass and treble control knobs, and the base Princeton was joined by the Princeton Reverb. A pull-out "boost" switch was added to the volume pot in 1978.

The Princeton is particularly famous as the basis for Mesa Boogie's Mark I, which is a heavily hot-rodded Princeton equipped with modified preamp and a Bassman transformer, allowing it a higher output of 60 watts.

Fender produced a solid-state Princeton from 1988 to 2001, the Princeton Chorus. Models from 1988-1991 ("red knob") were made in USA, models from 1991-1997 ("black knob") were also made in USA, and models from 1998-2001 ("black knob") were made in Mexico. This model was notable for its two independent 25.5-watt amplifiers running in stereo mode. The USA models used Accusonics Spring Reverb while the Mexican models used DSP Reverb. Recently, the American models made at Fender's Lake Oswego factory (branded 'LO') are becoming more sought after for their high quality and rich built-in chorus modulation.

In 2006, Fender revived the Princeton name, under "Princeton Recording-Amp" (Pro-tube series) and "Princeton 650" (under Dyna-touch III series). The Princeton recording amplifier is basically a blackface Princeton with built-in overdrive, compressor and power attenuator. Fender also reissued the Princeton Reverb in 2008.

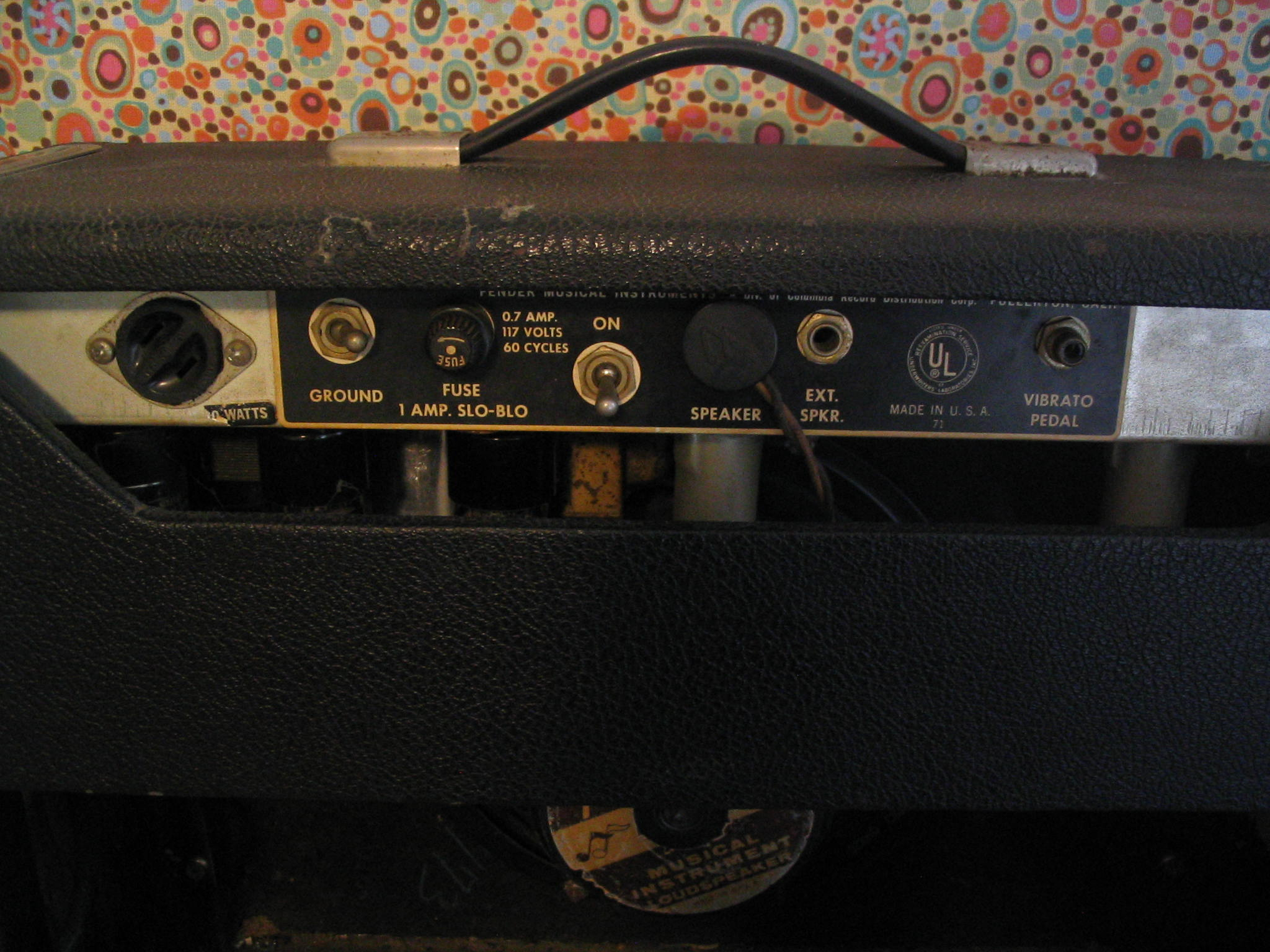
Back panel of 1966 Fender Princeton amplifier

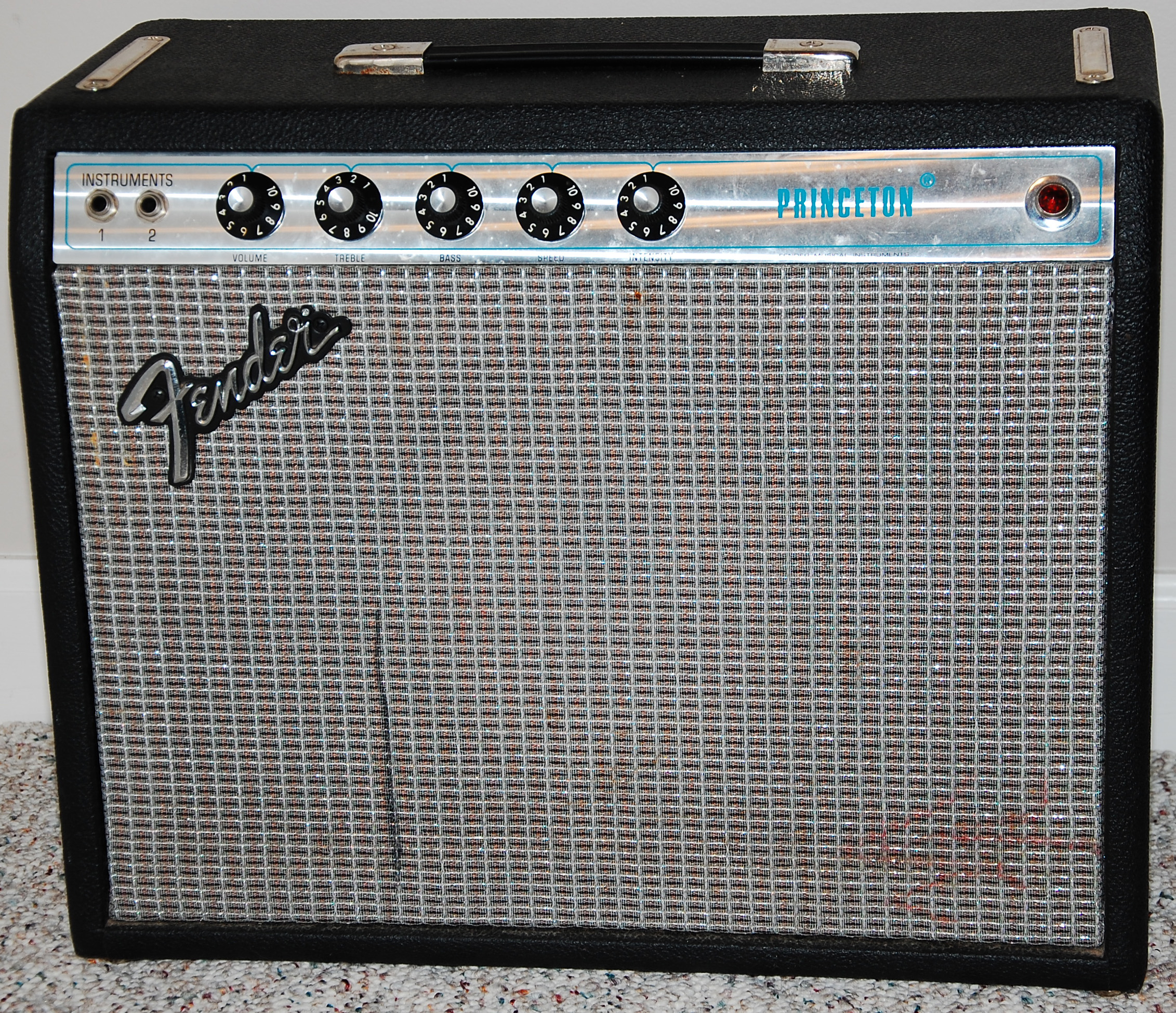
Princeton 1974/75

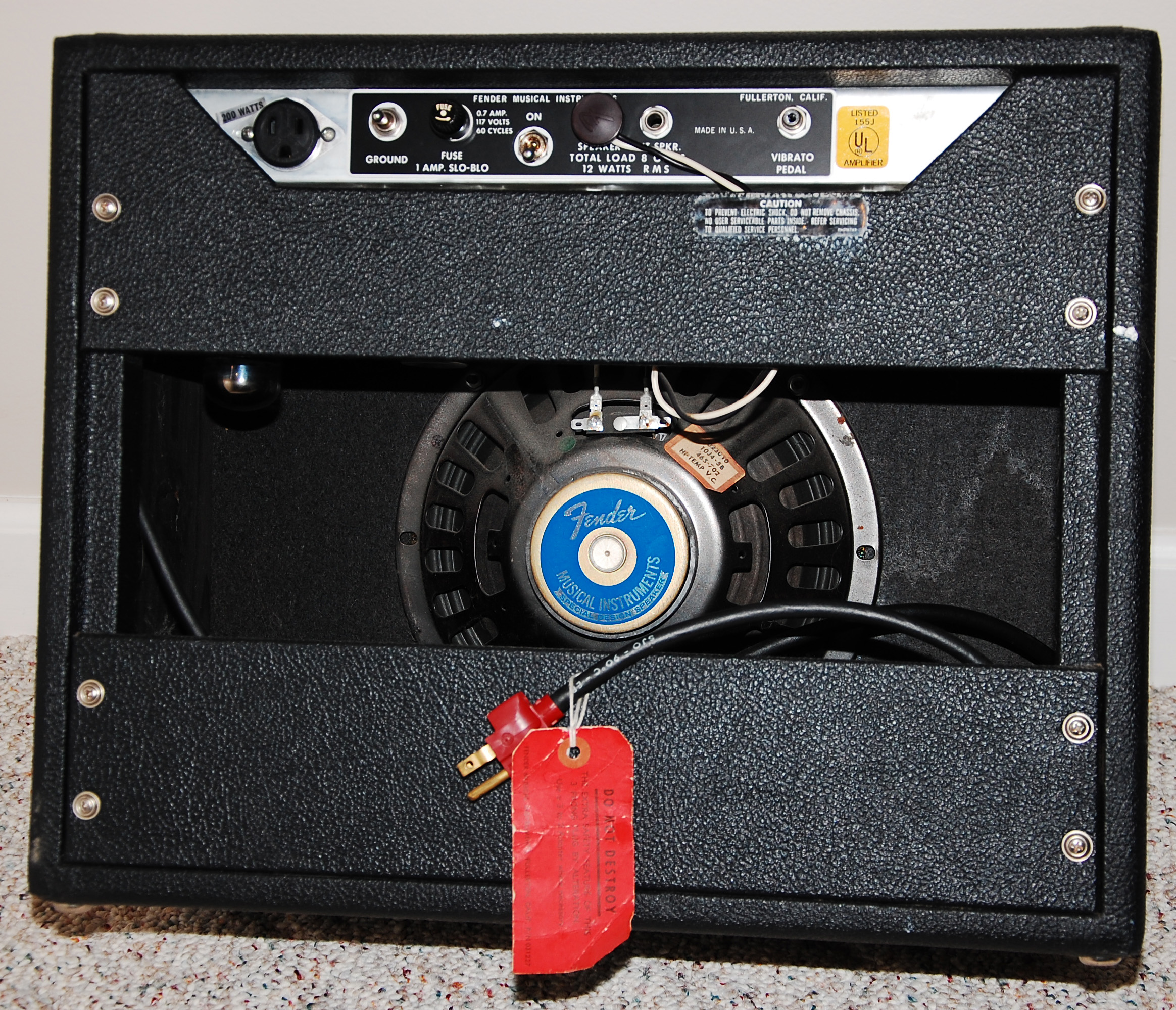
Back of 1974/75

== See also ==
- Fender Princeton Reverb
- White Amp
