= NPP Istok =

Russian military manufacturer

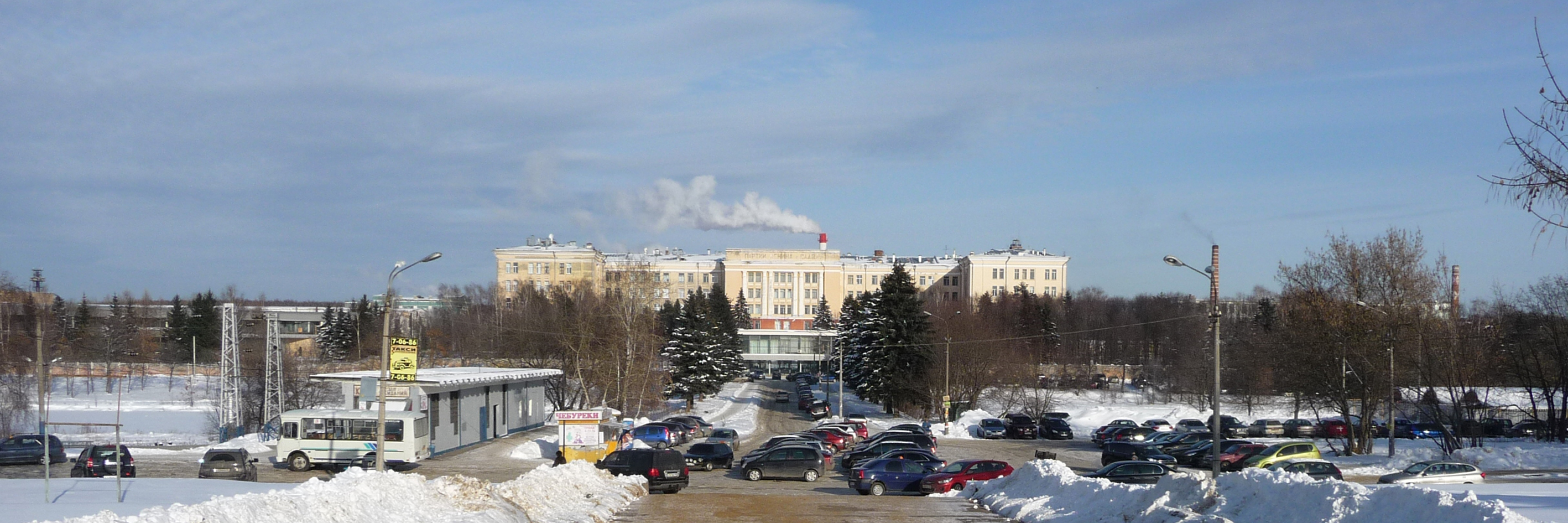
Istok in 2012

Istok State Scientific Production (Russian: Научно-производственное предприятие «Исток») is a company (scientific production association) based in Fryazino, Russia. It is part of the Ruselectronics group.

Istok is a major producer of electronic components for space and military use, including magnetrons, klystrons, high-powered vacuum tubes, carbon dioxide lasers, electro-optical devices. It has also developed and manufactured consumer products for the national economy since the 1960s.

For 2020, the company implemented the IIoT.ISTOK Industrial Internet of Things system, which monitors technical processes

== Directors ==
- Vekshinsky Sergey Arkadyevich (from 1943 to 1944)
- Egiazarov Vladimir Ivanovich (from 1944 to 1945)
- Zakharov Andrey Andreevich (from 1945 to 1947)
- Goltsov Valentin Alexandrovich (from 1947 to 1952)
- Fedorov Mstislav Mikhailovich (from 1953 to 1961)
- Rebrov Sergey Ivanovich (from 1956 to 1988)
- Korolev Alexandr Nikolaevich (from 1988 to 2009)
- Borisov Alexandr Anatolyevich (from 2009 to 2020(?))
