= Ferrite-Domen Scientific Research Institute =

Russian company

- Founded: 1959
- Headquarters: Saint Petersburg, Russia
- Parent: Ruselectronics

Ferrite-Domen Scientific Research Institute (Russian: Научно-исследовательский институт «Феррит-Домен») is a company based in Saint Petersburg, Russia. It is part of Ruselectronics.

NII Domen is well known for its ferrite materials, components, and devices, which are important elements of radioelectronic systems such as radars, radioastronomy, telecommunications, and of many others. SPA Ferrite is the leading Russian enterprise in the ferrite branch of the electronics industry.

== Products ==
Ferrite-Domen Scientific Research Institute produces more than 50 brands of ferrogranates, ferrospinels, hexaferrites and microwave ceramic dielectrics. The company also produces microwave devices based on a coaxial waveguide. These are valves, circulators, switches operating in the ranges from 30 MHz to 170 GHz. The average operating power of coaxial devices is up to 150 kW, pulse power is up to 1 MW.

The minimum achieved level of direct losses on coaxial fans and circulators is 0.1 dB. The microstrip line implements devices in the frequency range from 200 MHz to 100 GHz with an operating frequency band of up to 66% and direct losses of 0.3 dB, operating with an average power of up to 100 watts and a pulse power of up to 2 kW.

The specialists of the Ferrite-Domen Scientific Research Institute have created highly effective wide-range masking radio-absorbing coatings based on nanostructured films. Such coatings, due to the use of a nanostructured film with a thickness of 4 microns, reduce the radar visibility of ground-based equipment objects in the radio frequency and infrared wavelength ranges by 10 times.

== Awards ==
In 1981 the company was awarded the Order of the Red Banner of Labour. The leading specialist of the enterprise Vladimir Aleksandrovich Korytov, was awarded the honorary title of "Leading Machine Builder of the Russian Federation".
