= 7199 =

The 7199 is a vacuum tube, combining a pentode and triode. Typically, the pentode was used for the input stage, and the triode as a phase inverter. The tube was used in a number of American guitar amplifiers; the Gibson Guitar Corporation, for instance, used the 7199 in 1961's Falcon for the reverb circuit. Ampeg also used the 7199 extensively. Notable is the Dynaco ST-70 stereo amplifier introduced in 1959 which used a 7199 tube in the driver section of each channel. Over the next decade, more than 350,000 of these amplifiers were produced. American 7199 production ended sometime in the 1980s, while the Soviet tube company Sovtek produced one until roughly 2007. As a result, the tube is becoming increasingly scarce. Another tube of the same type found in far more plentiful supply is the 6U8A, which is electrically identical, but with a different pinout configuration. The 6U8A can be substituted for a 7199 using a readily available adapter, or by making a slight modification to the wiring of its tube socket.
