= 6AQ5 =

Vacuum tube

The 6AQ5 (Mullard–Philips tube designation EL90) is a miniature 7-pin (B7G) audio power output pentode vacuum tube with ratings virtually identical to the 6V6 at 250 V. It was commonly used as an output audio amplifier in tube TVs and radios. It was also used in transmitter circuits. There are versions of this tube with extended ratings for industrial application which are designated as 6AQ5A (with controlled heater warm-up characteristic), and 6AQ5W/6005 or 6005W (shock and vibration resistant).

A push–pull pair is capable of producing at least 10W audio output power in class AB1.

Also, in some cases it was used as vertical deflection output tube during the 1950s, being also rated for this purpose. For this application, 6AQ5-A was preferred. It was used for 70- and 90-degree picture tubes, but also in some early colour sets in the frame output.

Other close or equivalent tube types are: 6HG5, 6HR5, 6669, 6BM5, N727, CV1862 and the Tesla 6L31. The 6CM6, like the Russian 6P1P (6П1П), while electrically equivalent (up to 250 V anode voltage), have a 9 pin (B9A) base. Another similar, but not identical, amplifier pentode with a miniature 9-Pin base (B9A), used in consumer electronics was the 6M5.

== See also ==
- List of vacuum tubes
