= 6V6 =

Beam-power tetrode vacuum tube

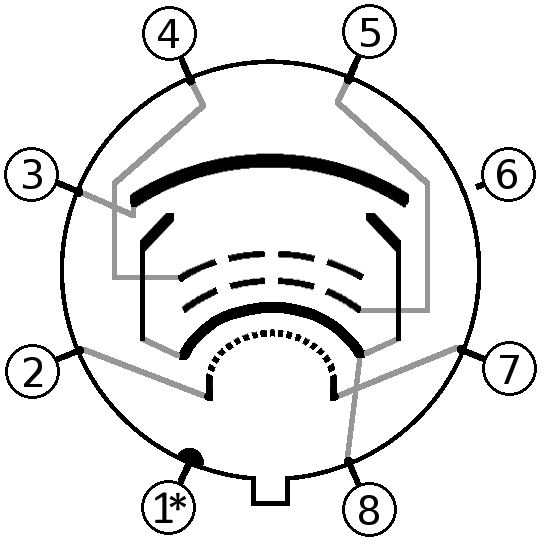
6V6 Octal socket basing diagram. 1 - * Unconnected in all versions except for the shell connection of the metal 6V6 2 & 7 - Filament / Heater 3 - Anode / Plate 4 - Grid 2 / Screen Grid 5 - Grid 1 / Control Grid 6 - No connection. Pin normally absent 8 - Cathode & Beam-Forming Plates

The 6V6 is a beam-power tetrode vacuum tube. The first of this family of tubes to be introduced was the 6V6G by Ken-Rad Tube & Lamp Corporation in late 1936, with the availability by December of both Ken-Rad and Raytheon 6V6G tubes announced. It is still in use in audio applications, especially electric guitar amplifiers.

Following the introduction in July 1936 of the 6L6, the potential of the scaled down version that became the 6V6 was soon realized. The lower-powered 6V6 was better-suited for average home use, and became common in the audio-output-stages of "farmhouse" table-top radios, where power pentodes such as the 6F6 had previously been used. The 6V6 required less heater power and produced less distortion than the 6F6, while yielding higher output in both single-ended and push-pull configurations.

Although the 6V6 was originally designed especially for use in automobile radios, the clip-in Loctal base 7C5, from early 1939, or the lower heater current 12V6GT, both with the identical characteristics to the 6V6, but with the smaller T-9 glass envelope, soon became the tubes of choice for many automotive radios manufacturers. Additionally, the 6V6 had applications in portable battery-operated radios.

The data sheet information supplied by the tube manufacturers' design-centers list the typical operation of an audio output stage for a single 6V6 as producing about 5W of continuous power, and a push-pull-pair about 14W. Amplifier manufacturers soon realized that the tube was capable of being used at ratings above the recommended maximums, and guitar amplifiers with 400V on the plates of a pair of 6V6GTA claim to produce an output power of 20W RMS at 5%THD with 40W Peak Music Power, and with 490V on the plates, as much as 30 W RMS.

== History ==
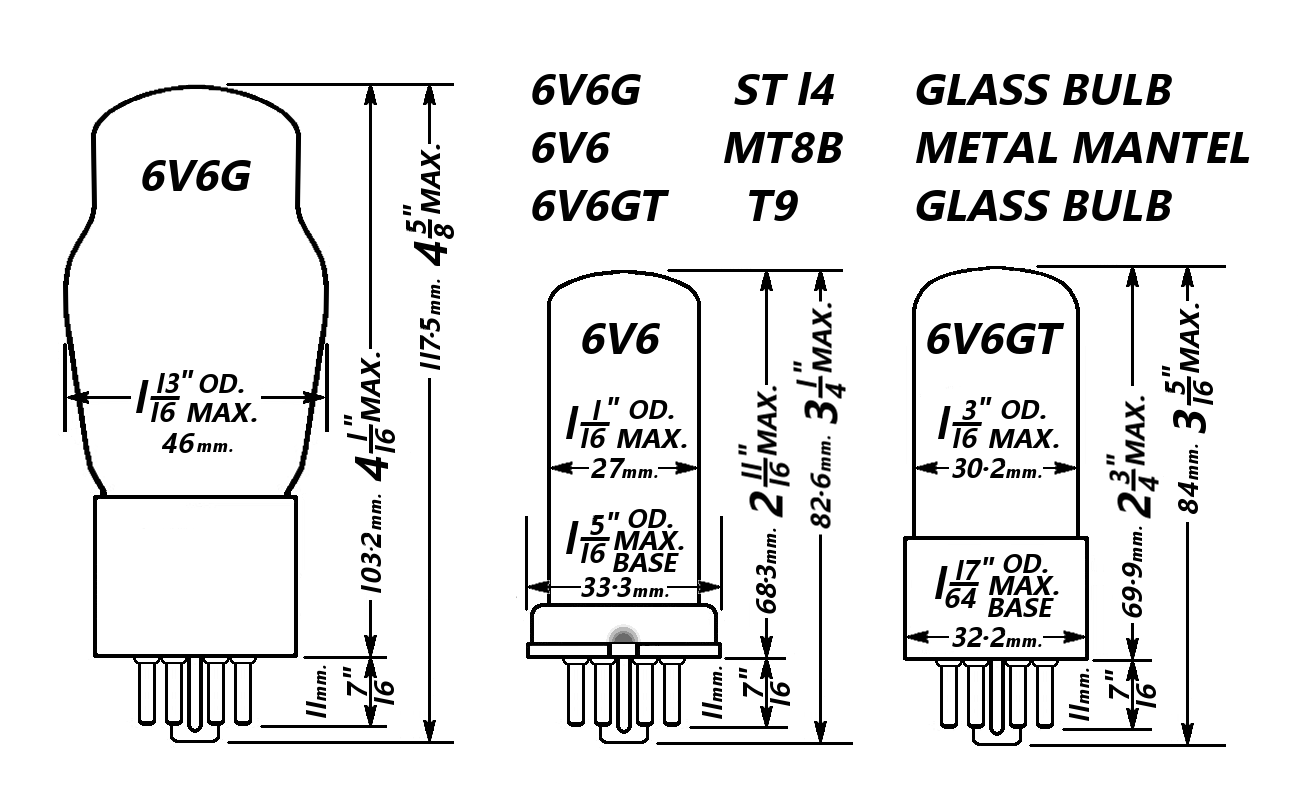
Different 6V6 tube envelope dimensions

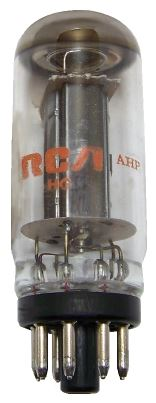
1970's "Coin"-based RCA 6V6GTA

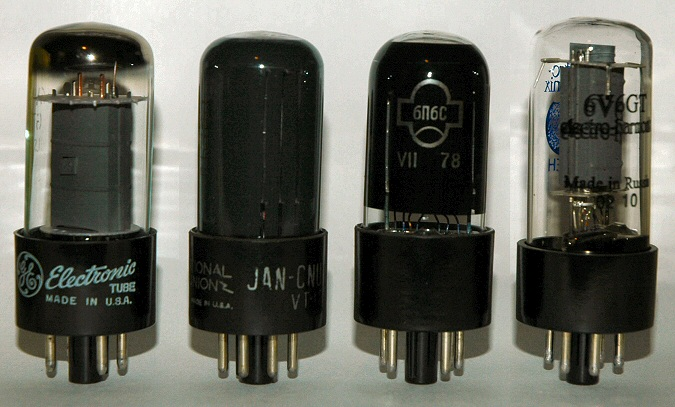
Various 6V6's manufactured around the world; from left to right – 6V6GTA by General Electric, 6V6GT JAN National Union (1940s), 6P6S (USSR, 1978) and modern production 6V6GT by Electro-Harmonix.

Following the 6V6G, RMA Release #96 - 09 Nov. 1936, sponsored by Ken-Rad Tube & Lamp Corporation, with the ST 14 shouldered glass envelope, the 6V6 was announced with a metal mantel in January 1937 by Hygrade Sylvania Corporation. The RMA Release #125 – 03 Jan.1938, Sponsored by RCA. for the 6V6 tube has led to some confusion as to the origins of the 6V6. The 6V6G but not the 6V6 is in the RCA manual RC-13 from July 1937, but the 6V6 is to be found in the 1937 tube manuals of other manufacturers, such as Raytheon.

Tube manufacturers were keen to promote the superiority of the metal tube construction that was introduced on April 1, 1935. Large quantities of the 6V6 tube were produced in the following decade, many as military supply JAN tubes. The price of the metal and glass versions were held to closely the same retail price level for the first few years of their production. The introduction of the 6V6GT, RMA Release #201 – 10 July 1939, was sponsored by Hytron Corporation. By 1940, the 6V6G production was largely superseded by this smaller "GT" T-9 glass envelope. On April 17, 1942, the War Production Board ordered radio tube manufacturers to discontinue within seven days the production for civilian use of 349 of the 710 types of radio tubes on the market, amongst these were the 6V6G and 6V6GX. By 1943, the price of the metal version was almost twice that of the GT version, and this proportional difference in price seems to have remained constant, right through to the end of the 1970s. The 6V6GTA – RMA Release #1681 – 2 July 1956, sponsored by Hygrade Sylvania Corporation, has a controlled warm-up period.

The various different NOS (new old stock) tubes of the 6V6 family, depending on manufacturer, model, series, strength and condition, will vary enormously in scarcity and therefore usually in price. The metal NOS 6V6 tube, once costing almost twice the price of its now highly valued glass enveloped counterparts, is now considered to be fairly common, and is usually the cheapest NOS tube available, with many current production tubes costing more than its 60 to 80 year older classic predecessor. In the final years of U.S. production, several of the major manufacturers switched to using the so-called "coin" based GT bulb.

== Current use ==
Now, over ninety years after its introduction, and still retaining its original characteristics, the 6V6 has one of the longest active lifetimes of any electronic component, having never been out of production in all this long period of time. Although historically widely used in all manner of electronic goods, many of which are still in service, it is in guitar amplifiers where its use has become archetypal. Not only are there very many existing amplifiers in regular use that rely on the 6V6, with contemporary reproductions of the more iconic models still being made, modern designers are still keen to develop new creations that rely on its use. Generally speaking, 6V6 tubes are sturdy and can be operated beyond their published specifications (the Soviet made 6P6S, and early Chinese 6V6 versions were not as permissive of exceeding design limits, although current production has improved). Because of this, the 6V6 soon proved itself to be suitable for use in consumer-market musical instrument amplifiers, particularly combo-style guitar amps such as the Gibson GA-40, and the Fender Amplifiers; Champ, Princeton, and Deluxe, some of which drive their 6V6s well in excess of the datasheet specified maximum rating. This ongoing demand encourages Chinese, Slovak and Russian tube factories not only to keep the 6V6 in production to this day, but to further develop the supply.

== The 6V6 Family and equivalents ==
6V6G – Glass "Shouldered Tube" ST envelope.

6V6GX – Glass "Shouldered Tube" ST envelope, Ceramic Base.

6V6 – Metal jacketed envelope. The metal envelope of 6V6 is connected to pin 1 of the base, and was normally used as a ground. Pin 1 of the other members of the 6V6 family of tubes are usually not internally connected, although some may have the gray RF shield connected.

6V6GT – smaller "Glass Tube" T-9 envelope.

6V6GTA – with a controlled warm-up period.

6V6GTY – a GT with a low loss micanol brown base.

6V6GTX = HY6V6GTX – a GT "Bantam" selected for high gain, with a ceramic base, 15W plate dissipation rating, produced for a limited period around 1941 by Hytron.

5871 – Ruggedized 6V6GT for operation under severe vibrations found in aircraft and similar applications. Radio Valve Co. of Canada Ltd., 1954 : RMA #859A.

5992 – Premium, ruggedized 6V6GT with heater current raised to 600mA. Bendix and GE known manufacturers.

7408 – 6V6GT with additional zero-bias characteristics.

6V6S – A modern production, large plated tube, heater current 500mA, with a higher plate and screen voltage rating. Made by JJ Electronic.

6V6GT(A)(B)-STR – Modern production valve, STR signifying "Special Test Requirement." Claiming to be heavy duty, suitable for high plate voltage.

Military specification 6V6 tubes and their equivalents

American military services contracted tubes from many sources through the U.S. War Department. They used a Joint Army-Navy Nomenclature System (AN System. JAN) Most of these tubes bear the JAN marking as well as a VT number (VT = vacuum tube).

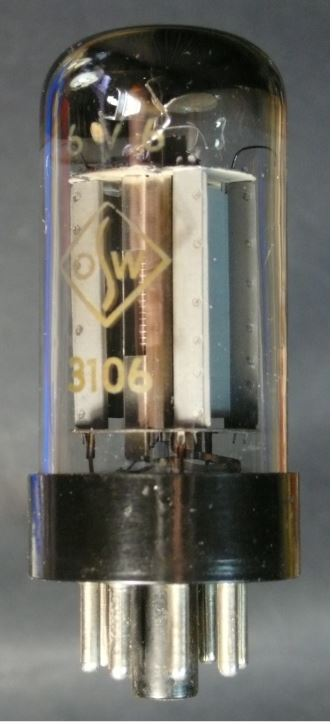
3106 - 6V6 tube made in East Germany.

VT-107 – Metal 6V6.

6V6Y – Metal, with a low loss micanol brown base.

VT-107A – 6V6GT.

VT-107B – 6V6G.

British Ministry Of Supply valves for the Military & other governmental agencies have a CV number (CV = common valve). Old stores reference numbers with the prefix ZA are also sometimes used. Supplied by Mullard & Brimar.

CV509 = ZA5306 – 6V6G

CV510 – 6V6

CV511 – 6V6GT & 6V6GTY

The British GPO also used their own VT (Valve - Thermionic) numbering system

VT196 = CV509 = 6V6G – General Post Office (GPO)

Swedish Military supplier Bofors, had tubes made by Standard Radiofabrik (SRF) at the Ulvsunda plant in Stockholm.

5S2D - Premium, ruggedized 6V6GT with triple micas, low loss micanol brown base.

Other tubes cited as being equivalent

6P6S (6П6С in Cyrillic.) Also 6П2 - In the Soviet Union a version of the 6V6GT was produced since the late 1940s which appears to be a close copy of the 1940s Sylvania-issue 6V6GT – initially under its American designation (in both Latin and Cyrillic lettering), but later, the USSR adopted its own system of designations.

6P11S (6П11С in Cyrillic.) = 6П6С-Y2 - Military consignment, ruggedized 6P6S. OTK tested. Higher Voltage ratings.

1515 - Premium version of the 6P6S (6П6С).

6P6P - Chinese version of the 6V6GT made by Shuguang, but now obsolete, different from Shuguang's current production 6V6GT.

3106 – East German production 6V6GT from OSW (Oberspreewerk Berlin, later HF, then WF with 6П6С & 6V6 marking). Open, split-plate design.

6AY5 – East German production 6V6GT

VT227 = 7184 – Cited equivalent, made by Ken-Rad, inadequate documentation, no RMA registration.

WT-210-00-82 – Cited equivalent, inadequate documentation, no RMA registration.

WTT-123 – Cited equivalent, inadequate documentation, no RMA registration.

6V6HD – NOT a 6V6, but relabeled Sovtek 6L6GA / 6P3S.

== Similar tubes ==
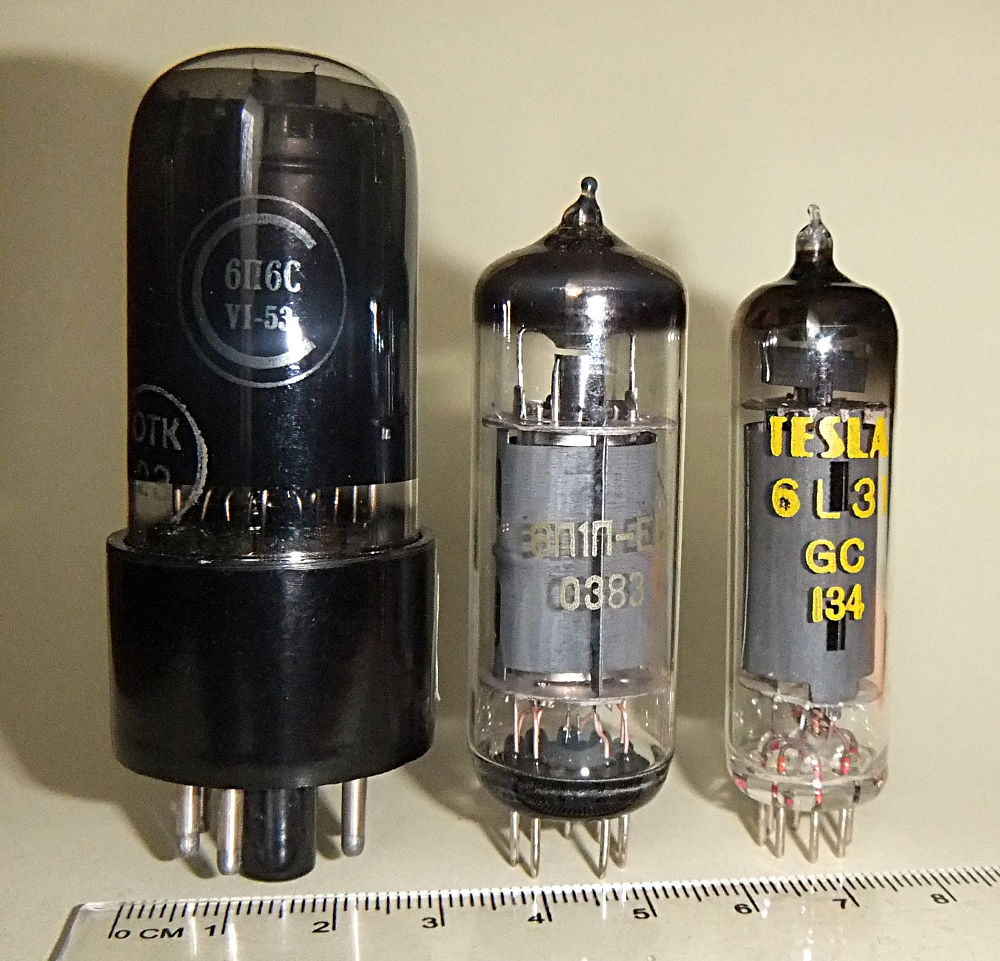
Derivatives of 6V6: 6P6S, 6P1P (USSR), 6L31 (Tesla)

These tubes have very similar characteristics to the 6V6, but differ either in the heater rating, or use a different socket and pin-out

5V6GT - Same as the 6V6GT, but with different heater ratings - 4.7V, 0.6A, controlled 11 sec. warm-up time.

12V6GT - Same as the 6V6GT, but with different heater ratings - 12.6V, 0.225A, suitable for automotive receiver applications.

7C5 - Clip-in Loctal B8G base, T-9 Bulb. Raytheon - 1939 RMA #162. Other version of this tube are 7C5-TV, 2C48, 2C50, N148, CV885

7C5LT = CV886 - Same as the 7C5, except with a small wafer Octalox base 8-pin T-9 Bulb. RCA – 1940 RMA #234.

14C5 - Same as 7C5 but with 12.6V Heater.

6BW6 = CV2136 - British-made miniature-tube 12W equivalent of the 6V6, 9-pin base B9A.

6061 – Premium, ruggedized 6BW6. Brimar STC London. 1951: RMA #965

CV4043 - British-made miniature-tube 13.5W equivalent of the 6BW6, 9-pin base B9A.

6AQ5 - slightly lower specifications to the 6V6GT, miniature glass envelope, 7-pin base B7G. Other equivalents of this tube are the CV1862, EL90, 6005, 6095, 6669, 6928, BPM 04, CK-6005, M8249, N727, 6L31

12AQ5 - Same as the 6AQ5, but with different heater ratings.

6P1P (6П1П in Cyrillic.) - 9-pin B9A Noval base Soviet version, not identical characteristics, but very close

6973 - US-version, 9 pin Noval base tube, higher plate voltage ratings, intended for high fidelity output applications.

6CM6 - 9 pin Noval base tube, equivalent type primarily intended for vertical deflection amplifiers in television receivers.

12CM6 - Same as the 6CM6, but with different heater ratings.

12AB5 - 9 pin Noval base tube with 12V heater, suitable for automotive receiver applications. Equivalent to the 7061

The pentode EL84/6BQ5 - 9 pin Noval base tube, that although different enough from the 6V6 not to justify rating it as an equivalent, because of its popularity and ready availability, plus having a close-enough similarity to make it possible, if bias is altered, adapters have been developed commercially to allow an amplifier designed for 6V6 use to accept the noval-based EL84 tube. However, before making this alteration, care must be taken because heater current is with 300 mA higher in EL84, about 750 mA at 6.3 V, compared to 6V6 (and derivatives) that has 450 mA at 6.3 V, so making this change may overload the heater winding of the device. Likewise, the inverse adapter is also available.

== See also ==
- List of vacuum tubes
- KT66
- KT88
- 6L6
- 6CA7/EL34/KT77
- 807
- Beam tetrode

== General references ==
- Stokes, John. 70 Years of Radio Tubes and Valves. NY: Vestal Press, 1982.
- Radio News magazine, March 1937, page 567, "The Radio Workshop."
- Radio-Craft magazine, October 1937, page 204, "New Tubes for the Radio Experimenter."
- RMA (Radio Manufacturers Association) "Electron Tube Registration List"
- Fender Musical Instruments, Amplifier Owners Manual's, 1983.
- Jim Kelley Amplifiers, Amplifier Owners Manual.
- Guitar Player Magazine, June 1983.
- O'Connor, Kevin. T.U.T. Vol.5. Powerpress Publishing, 2004.
- Receiving Tube Manual, RC-20. RCA corporation. 1964.
