= EL84 =

Power pentode vacuum tube

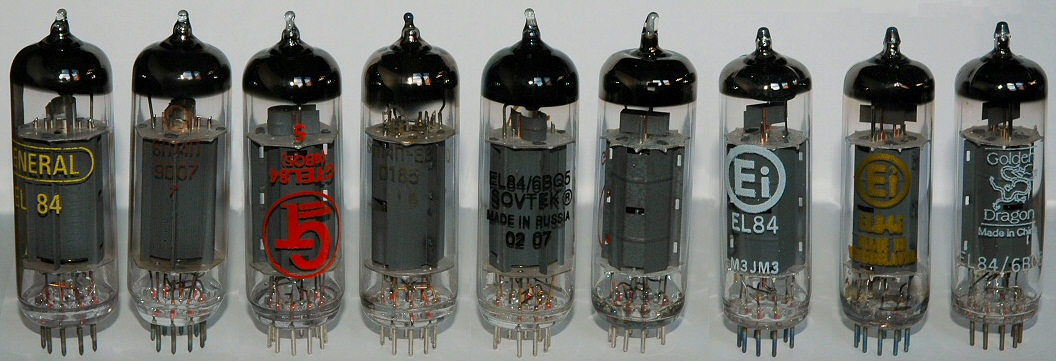
- Common variants of the EL84, manufactured in Russia, Yugoslavia, Slovakia, and China
- Classification: Thermionic Pentode
- Service: Audio

Socket connections
- B9A (Noval)

The EL84 is a vacuum tube of the power pentode type. It is used in the power-output stages of audio amplifiers, most commonly now in guitar amplifiers, but originally in radios. The EL84 is smaller and more sensitive than the octal 6V6 that was widely used around the world until the 1960s. An interchangeable North American type is the 6BQ5 (the RETMA tube designation name for the EL84).

The EL84 was developed to eliminate the need for a driver tube in radios, so it has rather more gain than is usual in a power pentode. Eliminating a preamplifier triode in radios made them cheaper. Manufacturers were quick to adopt it in general use, and they are found in many old European tube-radios and other audio equipment. A single EL84 was used in low-cost equipment, and a push–pull pair for lower distortion and higher power.

In common with all 'E' prefix tubes, using the Mullard–Philips tube designation, it has a heater voltage of 6.3V. It can produce 17W output in Class AB1 in push–pull configuration. Many guitar-amplifiers routinely run EL84 tubes in excess of 400VDC, with the Traynor Guitarmate reportedly putting out 25W (average) with 2 EL84s in a push–pull configuration and a B+ between 400 and 420 VDC.

Developed by Philips in 1953, and used in the British Mullard 5-10 amplifier circuit, the EL84 came to prominence when used in Vox amplifiers preferred by many British Invasion bands of the 1960s.

== N709, 6BQ5/EL84/6P15, and other exact equivalents ==
The 1959 Miniwatt Technical Data book from Philips lists the 6BQ5 as the R.E.T.M.A. (American) name for the EL84 in its "Type Number Cross Reference", and hence an exact substitute. American and Japanese manufacturers might label their versions of the EL84 as EL84/6BQ5 or 6BQ5/EL84 or simply "6BQ5". Other manufacturers followed with their versions, such as the N709 from General Electric Co. Ltd. of England and the 6P15 from UK brand Mazda, that were designed to be drop-in substitutes. CV2975 is the military designation (Common Tube) for EL84.

Other equivalent tubes are the 7189 and 7189A, an extended-ratings version of the tube for industrial applications, the E84L (7320), a long-life, professional version with more than 10000 hours expected lifetime, and the directly equivalent 6P14P (Cyrillic: 6П14П) produced in the USSR by the Reflektor plant. As of 2012 a slightly modified version of the 6P14P was manufactured in Russia for Sovtek. An extended-ratings version of the 6P14P is also available, the 6P14P-EV (Cyrillic: 6П14П-ЕВ), and it is known among US guitar players as EL84M or the Russian military EL84. While not necessarily a true military version of the tube (in fact it is more comparable to the 7189), 6P14P-EVs are known for their low noise and durability. Large new-old-stock supplies of the tube are available. The 6GK6 has nearly equivalent operating characteristics with a different pinout.

As of 2022 the tube was manufactured in Russia (Sovtek, Electro-Harmonix, Tung-Sol, Mullard and Genalex Gold Lion brands), Slovakia- Čadca (JJ Electronic) and China (Psvane brand made by Hengyang Electronics). The Sovtek EL84 is often sold under their own brand name by other well-known electric guitar and guitar amplifier manufacturers – such as Fender or Mesa Boogie.

Also see 6P1P.

== Characteristics ==
Specifications given for the EL84, PL84, and UL84 are from Philips; RCA and Sylvania list slightly higher voltage ratings for Va and Vkf and lower for Vg2 for the xCW5 series – the 6CW5/EL86, 8CW5/XL86, 10CW5/LL86, 15CW5/PL84, and 30CW5/HL84.

Characteristic	EL84/6BQ5, N709	8BQ5/XL84	10BQ5/LL84	EL86/6CW5	10CW5/LL86	PL84/15CW5	UL84/45B5
Basing Diagram	9CV (pin 1: ic; pin 2: g_{1}; pin 3: k+g_{3}; pin 4: h; pin 5: h; pin 6: ic; pin 7: anode; pin 8: ic; pin 9: g_{2}) where ic = internal connection						
Heater	6.3 V, 760 mA	8.0 V, 600 mA or 8.5 V, 600 mA	10.6 V, 450 mA (Sylvania); 10.5 V, 450 mA (RCA)	6.3 V, 760 mA	10.6 V, 450 mA	15 V, 300 mA	45 V, 100 mA
Maximum Voltage Ratings	300 V_{a} 300 V_{g2} 100 V_{kf}			250 V_{a} (Philips) or 275 V_{a} (RCA, Sylvania); 250 V_{g2} (Philips) or 220 V_{g2} (RCA, Sylvania); 200 V_{kf} (Philips) or 220 V_{kf} (RCA, Sylvania)			250 V_{a} 200 V_{g2} 200 V_{kf}
Maximum Power Ratings	12 W_{a} 1.75 W_{g2} (Philips) or 2 W_{g2} (RCA, Sylvania)			12 W_{a} (Philips) or 14 W_{a} (RCA); 1.75 W_{g2} (Philips) or 2.1 W_{g2} (RCA, Sylvania)			
Maximum Cathode Current, I_{k}	65 mA			100 mA			
Transconductance	11.3 mA/V			11.0 mA/V			
Internal (plate) resistance, R_{i}	38 kΩ			26 kΩ			
Test Conditions	250 V_{a} 250 V_{g2} I_{a} = 48 mA; R_{k} = 135 Ω			170 V_{a} 170 V_{g2} I_{a} = 70 mA -12.5 V_{g1}			
Maximum Output Power (single-ended Class A)	5.7 W @10% THD into 5200 Ω, 250 V supply, 4.3 V_{RMS} input			5.3 W @10% THD into 2500 Ω, 200 V supply, 7.0 V_{RMS} input			
Maximum Output Power (2 tubes, push-pull Class AB)	17 W @4% THD into 4+4 kΩ, 300 V supply, 10 V_{RMS} input			17.5 W @5.4% THD into 2+2 kΩ, 230 V supply, 14.6V _{RMS} input			14.3 W @3.8% THD into 1.5 + 1.5 kΩ, 200 V supply, 14.3 V_{RMS} input

== See also ==
- List of vacuum tubes
