= 6P1P =

Soviet-made vacuum tube

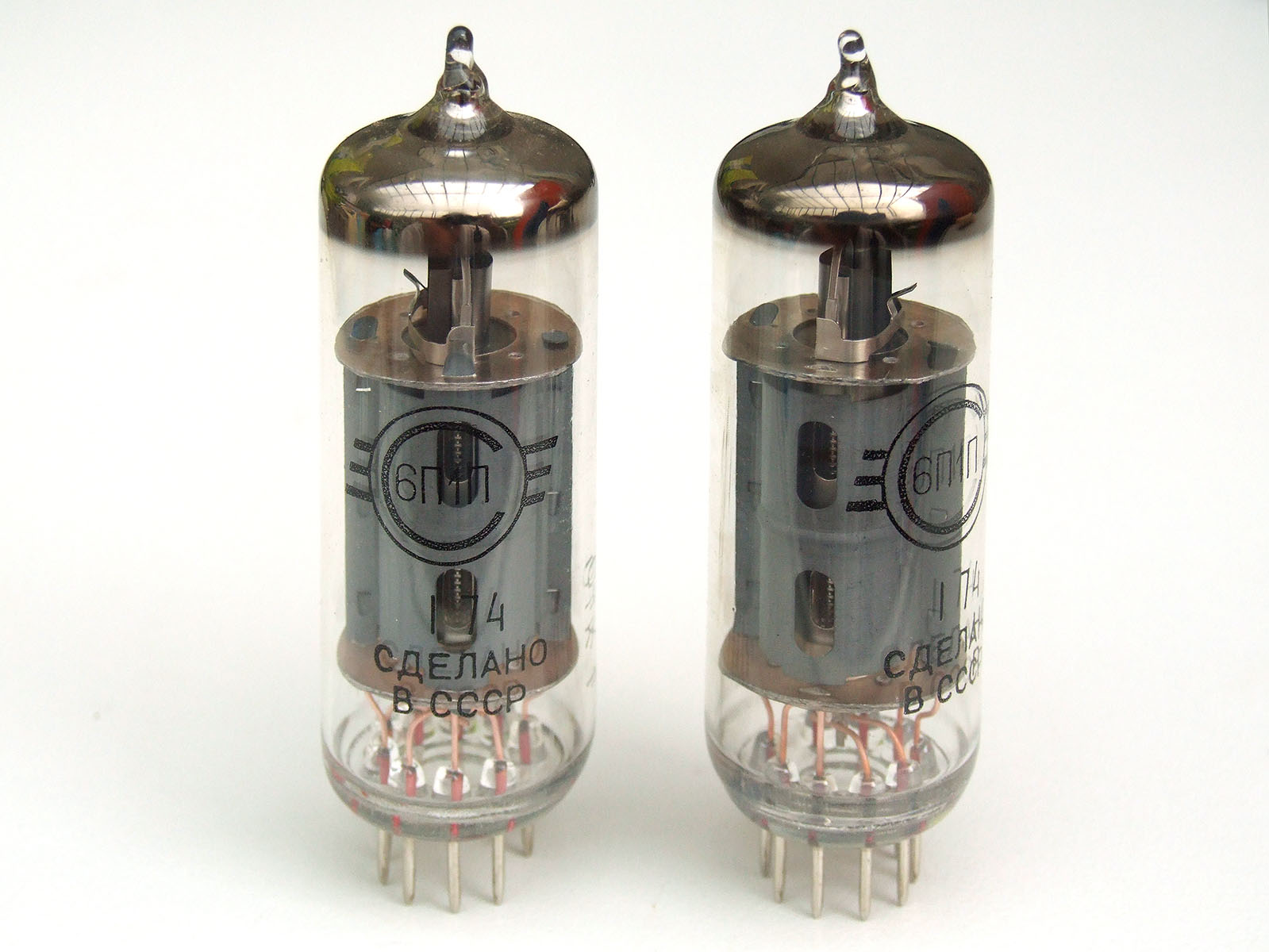
6P1P tube manufactured by Svetlana, USSR (winged "C" logo), 1971

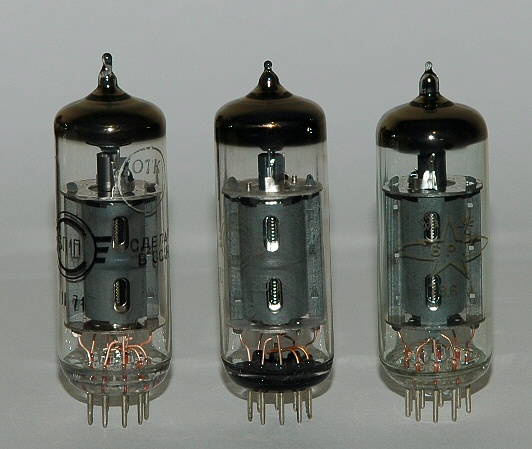
A comparison of Svetlana 6P1P (left), 6P1P-EV and Beijing Electron Tube Factory 6P1 (right)

The 6P1P (Russian: 6П1П) is a Soviet-made miniature 9-pin beam tetrode vacuum tube with ratings similar to the 6AQ5, EL90 and the 6V6. Because of a different pinout (a 9-pin base versus 7-pin base) than an 6AQ5/EL90, it cannot be used as a plug-in replacement for these types; however, it will work in the same circuit with component values unchanged. Its maximum plate/screen voltage and dissipation ratings are actually slightly higher than a 6AQ5. A ruggedized/extended ratings version of the tube is designated 6P1P-EV (Russian: 6П1П-ЕВ), roughly equivalent to the 6AQ5W. A Chinese-manufactured version of the tube also exists, labeled 6P1.

The type was commonly used in Soviet-built vacuum tube radios and TV sets as an output audio amplifier, until it was replaced by the higher-performance 6P14P (close to the EL84). In some old soviet TV sets (mainly before 1960 on 70 degrees deflection picture tubes), it was also used as frame output tube, until more specialized tubes for this purpose were developed in the Soviet union.

The tube is no longer believed to be in production.

== See also ==
- 6AQ5
- 6V6
- Russian tube designations
