= JSC Meteor Plant =

Russian-based producer of Frequency Control Products

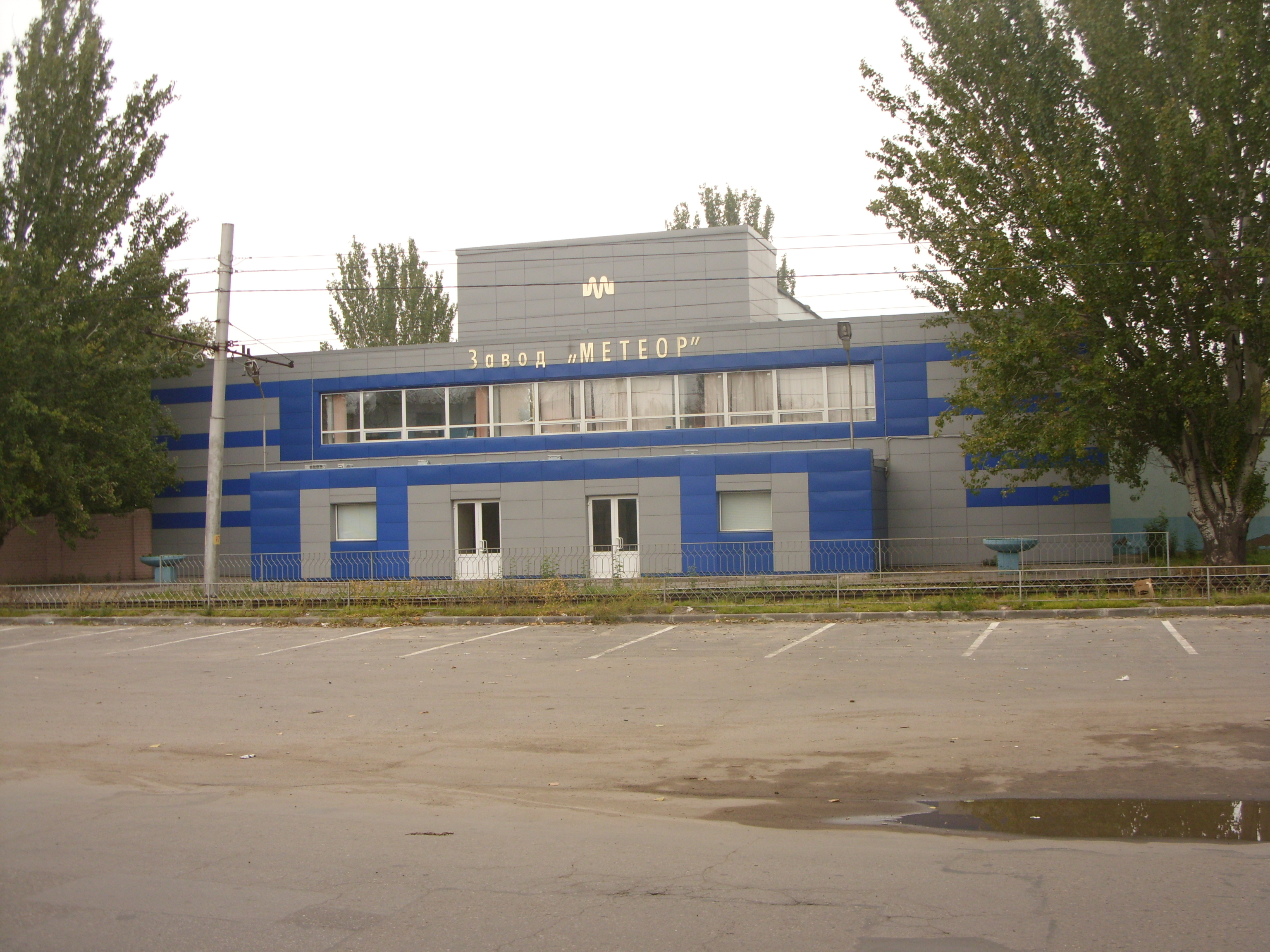
- Company type: Electronics Manufacturer
- Industry: Frequency Control, Quartz Crystal, Electronics, GPS, Wireless
- Founded: July 17, 1959
- Founder: USSR government
- Headquarters: Volzhsky, Russia
- Area served: Regional
- Products: TCXO, OCXO, VCXO, Quartz crystal, Crystal Oscillator
- Revenue: 422,220,000 Russian ruble (2016)
- Owner: Russian Federation
- Number of employees: Approximately 500 (2008)
- Parent: Ruselectronics
- Website: www.meteor.su

JSC Meteor Plant is a Russian-based producer of Frequency Control Products (quartz crystals, quartz oscillators and high-reliable piezoelectric filters).

== History ==
Meteor was officially founded on 17 July 1959 in Volzhsky city (Volgograd region). It pioneered producing quartz crystals HC-27/U (рус. КБ) and HC-29/U (рус. КА) – in USSR. By the end of the 1980s Meteor was considered as one of the leading quartz crystal manufacturer in the Soviet Union. The number of employees reached 5500 in 1989. Meteor was restructured as a joint stock company in 1993.

=== Market ===
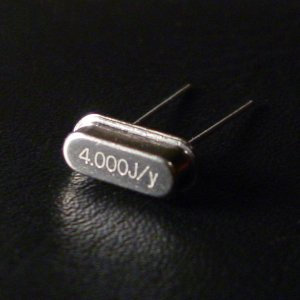
Crystal oscillator

Nowadays the company exports its production to nearly 500 enterprises from Russia and CIS (Commonwealth of Independent States). Meteor's production has industrial and satellite purpose. Its product range include quartz crystals for temperature compensated crystal oscillators (TCXO), for oven controlled crystal oscillators (OCXO), quartz crystals of general application for wide temperature range, quartz crystals of general application with heightened resistance to mechanical exposure.

The plant's quality system is certificated in accordance with certification system ISO 9001. JSC Meteor also has licenses by Russian Control systems federal agency on designing and manufacturing defence technologies. "Meteor" considered itself as a time-tested supplier for Russian radio electronic plants.

== Owners ==
According to the OKFS, the enterprise is a mixed Russian property with a share of federal ownership, according to the OKOPF it is an open joint stock company. The company's economy was voluntarily merged from state-owned enterprises.

It was registered as JSC "Meteor Plant" on November 22, 2002 at the address Volgograd region, Volzhsky, Gorky str., 1. In 2016, the company's profit amounted to 24.383 million rubles.

The authorized capital for 2016 is 7988.6 thousand Russian rubles. The company employs 474 people.
