= Svetlana (company) =

Russian electronic company

- Native name: ПАО «Светлана»
- Company type: Open joint-stock company
- Industry: Electronics
- Founded: 1889
- Headquarters: Saint Petersburg, Russia
- Net income: 254,760,000 Russian ruble
- Parent: Ruselectronics
- Website: Official website

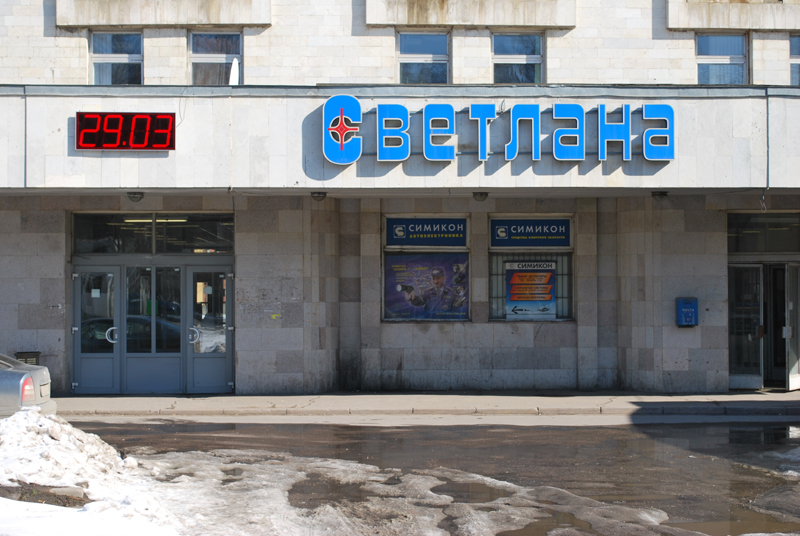
Svetlana Plant

PJSC Svetlana (Russian: ПАО «Светлана») is a company based in Saint Petersburg, Russia. It is primarily involved in the research, design, and manufacturing of electronic and microelectronic instruments. Svetlana is part of Ruselectronics. The name of the company is said to originate from the words for 'light of an incandescent lamp' (СВЕТ ЛАмпы НАкаливания).

== History ==
The company was established in 1889 as the Ya. M. Aivaz (Russian: Я. М. Айваз) Factory. Svetlana was a major producer of vacuum tubes. In 1937, the Soviet Union purchased a tube assembly line from RCA, including production licenses and initial staff training, and installed it on the St Petersburg plant. US-licensed tubes were produced since then.

Since 2001, New Sensor Corp. has been holding the rights for the Svetlana vacuum tube brand for the US and Canada. The New Sensor tubes are actually manufactured at the Expo-pul factory (former Reflektor plant) in Saratov. Tubes manufactured by Svetlana in Saint Petersburg still bear the "winged С" (cyrillic S) logo (see the image below) but no longer the name Svetlana.

In 2014, businessman Andrey Berezin joined the shareholders of Svetlana. One of his entities, AuditExpert, acquired a stake in the enterprise. At the same time, Berezin himself took a seat on the plant's Board of Directors.

In 2017 the company announced a 3-billion-ruble modernization plan.

In September 2021, AuditExpert sold its stake in Svetlana (Berezin had previously exited from the capital of AuditExpert). In May 2022, Berezin left the plant's Board of Directors.

== Products ==
The Svetlana Association produces a variety of electronic and microelectronic instruments, including transmitting and modulator tubes for all frequency ranges; X-band broadband passive TR limiter; KU-band broadband TR tube; klystron amplifiers; X-ray tubes; portable X-ray units for medicine and industry; high-frequency fast response thyristors; transistors; integrated microcircuits; microcomputers; microcontrollers; microcalculators; ultrasonic delay lines; receiving tubes; process equipment for the manufacture of electronic engineering items. Vacuum tubes currently in production include the 6550, 6L6, EL34, and KT88.

Examples of Svetlana products

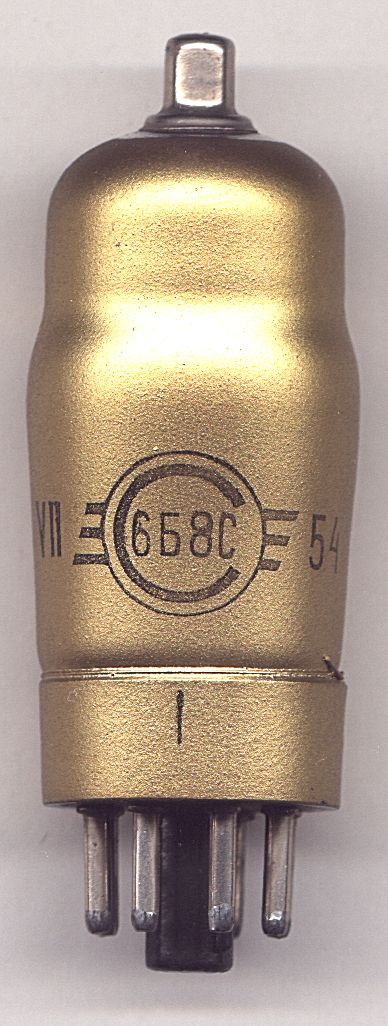
Vacuum tube 6B8S, manufactured in 1954, bearing the "winged С" (cyrillic S) logo of Svetlana

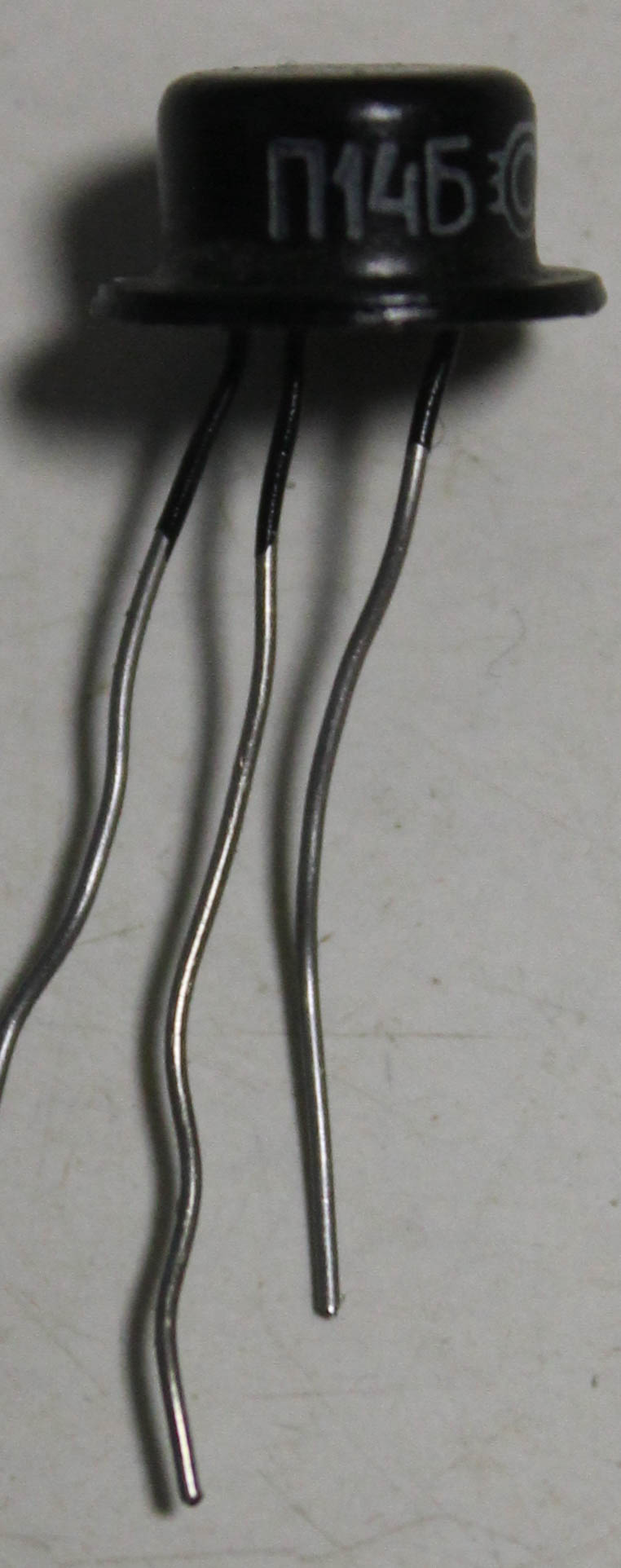
Germanium transistor P14B, manufactured in 1961

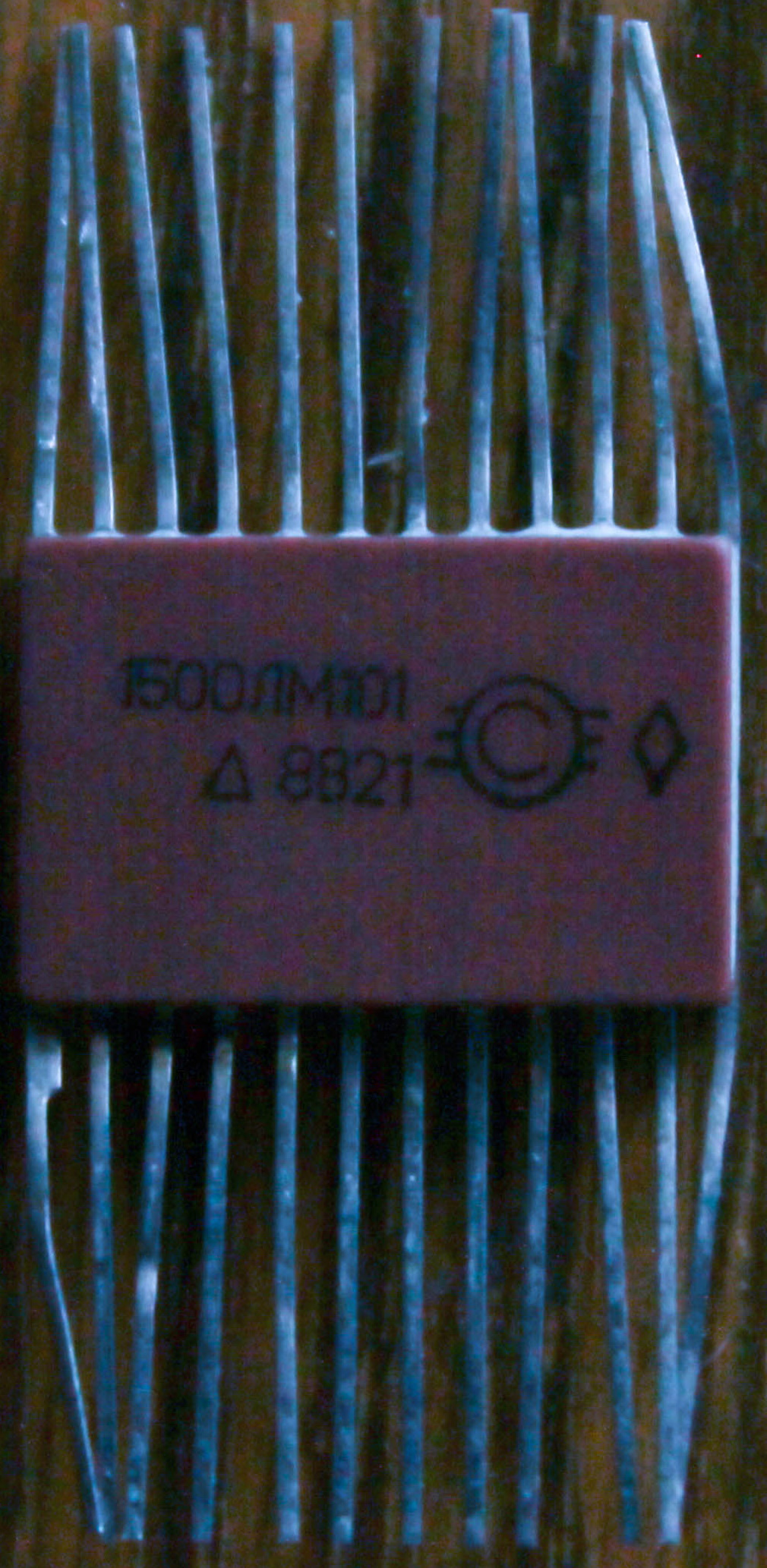
ECL integrated circuit 1500LM101, manufactured in 1988

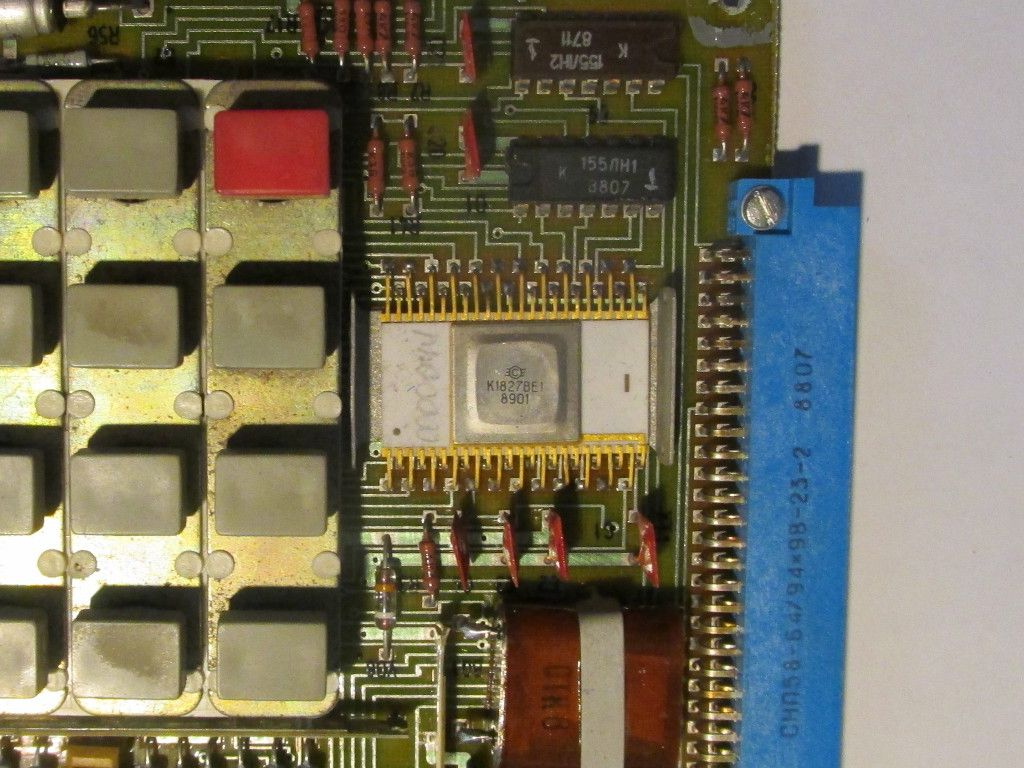
16-bit microcontroller K1827VE1 (1989) in an MS2703 microcomputer, also from Svetlana

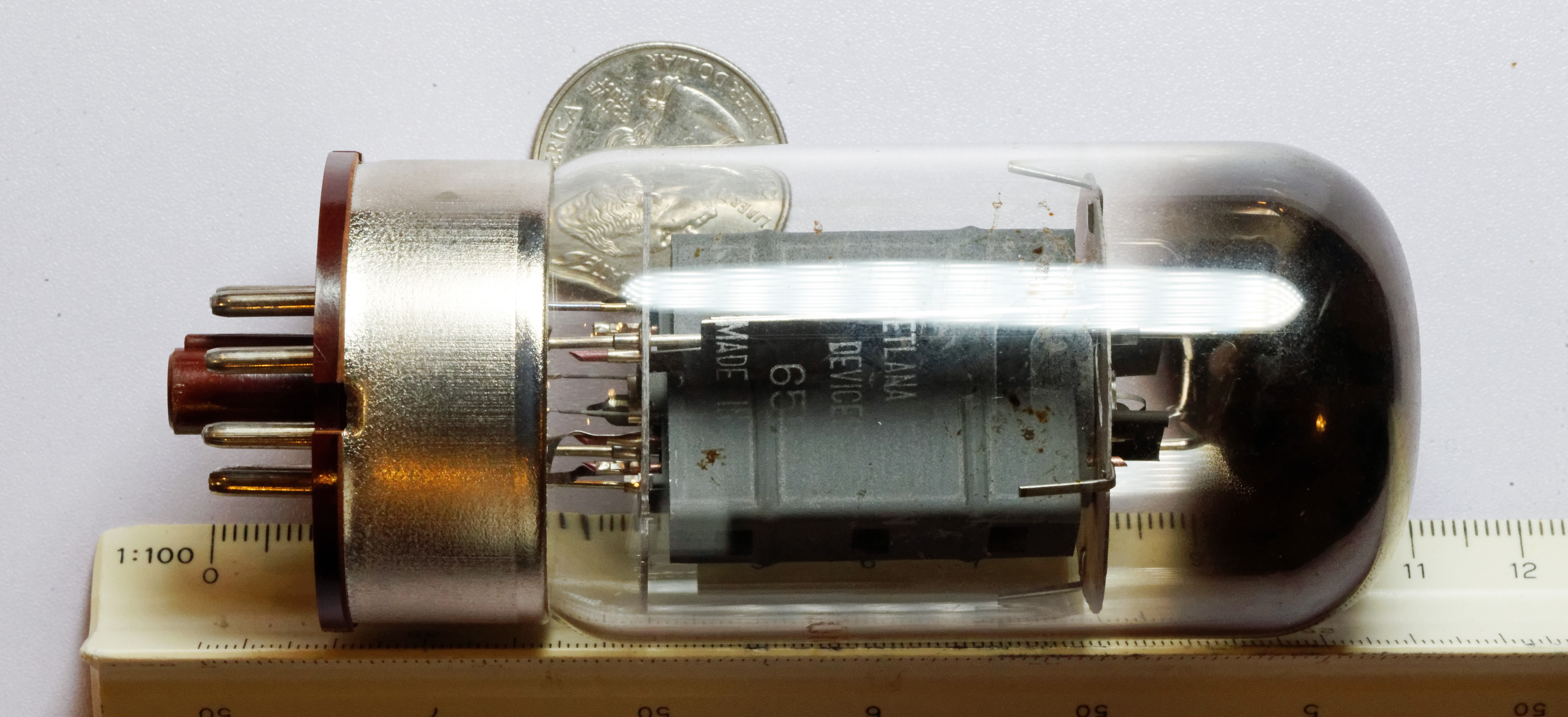
Vacuum tube 6550 C

== Directors ==
- 1961-1969 — Kaminsky I. I.
- 1969-1988 — Filatov O. V.
- 1988-1991 — Khizha G. S.
- 1991-1993 — Shchukin Gennady Anatolyevich
- 1993-1994 — Bashkatov V. E.
- 1994-2014 — Popov V. V.
- since 2014 — Gladkov N. Y.

== Awards ==
- 1931 – Order of Lenin (№8) for the implementation of the production plan of the first five-year plan in two and a half years.
- 1937 – diploma and "Grand Prix" at the International Exhibition of Art and Technology in Paris for powerful generator lamps GDO-15, GKO-10 manufactured by the Svetlana.

== See also ==
- 6P1P vacuum tube
- Russian tube designations
- 7400 series – Second sources in Europe and the Eastern Bloc
- Soviet integrated circuit designation
