= Ruselectronics =

Russian state-owned company

- Type: Joint-Stock Company (holding company)
- Industry: microelectronics
- Founded: 1997; 29 years ago
- Founder: Government of Russia
- Headquarters: Moscow, Russia
- Key people: Andrey Zverev (CEO)
- Products: electronics, microelectronics, nanoelectronics, microwave devices, electrical engineering, radio frequency engineering, software engineering, night vision devices, semiconductor devices, photovoltaic devices, integrated circuits, quantum electronics, vacuum tubes, medical devices, ferrite devices, electron accelerators, cryptography, information security systems, IT, telecommunication
- Revenue: $88 million (2016)
- Operating income: $39 million (2016)
- Net income: $26.6 million (2016)
- Number of employees: 38,500 (2012; 2016)
- Parent: State corporation 'ROSTEC'
- Subsidiaries: See below
- Website: www.ruselectronics.ru

JSC Ruselectronics (Russian: Росэлектроника, romanized: Roselectronica, also AO Roselektronika) also known as Rosel (Russian: Росэл), is a Russian state-owned holding company founded in 1997. It is fully owned by Rostec.

Ruselectronics was reputed to be responsible for the production of approximately 80 percent of all Russian electronics components as of 2015.

== History ==
Ruselectronics integrates the electronics sector companies focused on designing and producing electronic materials, equipment, semiconductor products and microwave technologies. The Holding company was established in the beginning of 2009 on the basis of the holding that was created in 1997.
At the end of 2012 the supervisory board of the Corporation decided to integrate Sirius and Orion groups of companies into the Ruselectronics Holding.

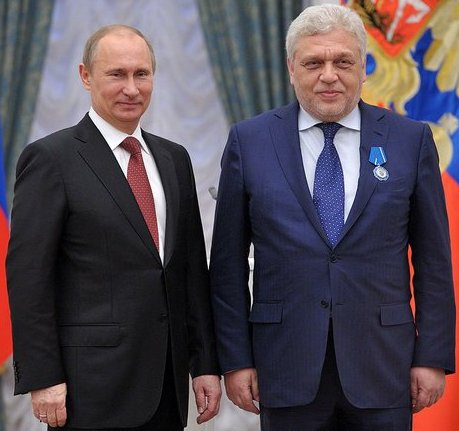
CEO of JSC 'Ruselectronics' Andrey Zverev (2008–2016) honored by Vladimir Putin

In December 2012, Rostec’s supervisory board transferred the assets of Sirius and Orion to Russian Electronics.

Orion was founded in 2009 as a special-purpose research and industrial association to develop communication systems, subsystems and equipment for defence, special and double purposes. Its companies were located in six federal regions. Orion employed 11,000 people. It controlled 17 organizations, including JSC Omsk Research Institute for Instrument Engineering, JSC Barnaul Special Vostok Construction Bureau, and JSC Integral Research Institute for Special Communication Systems.

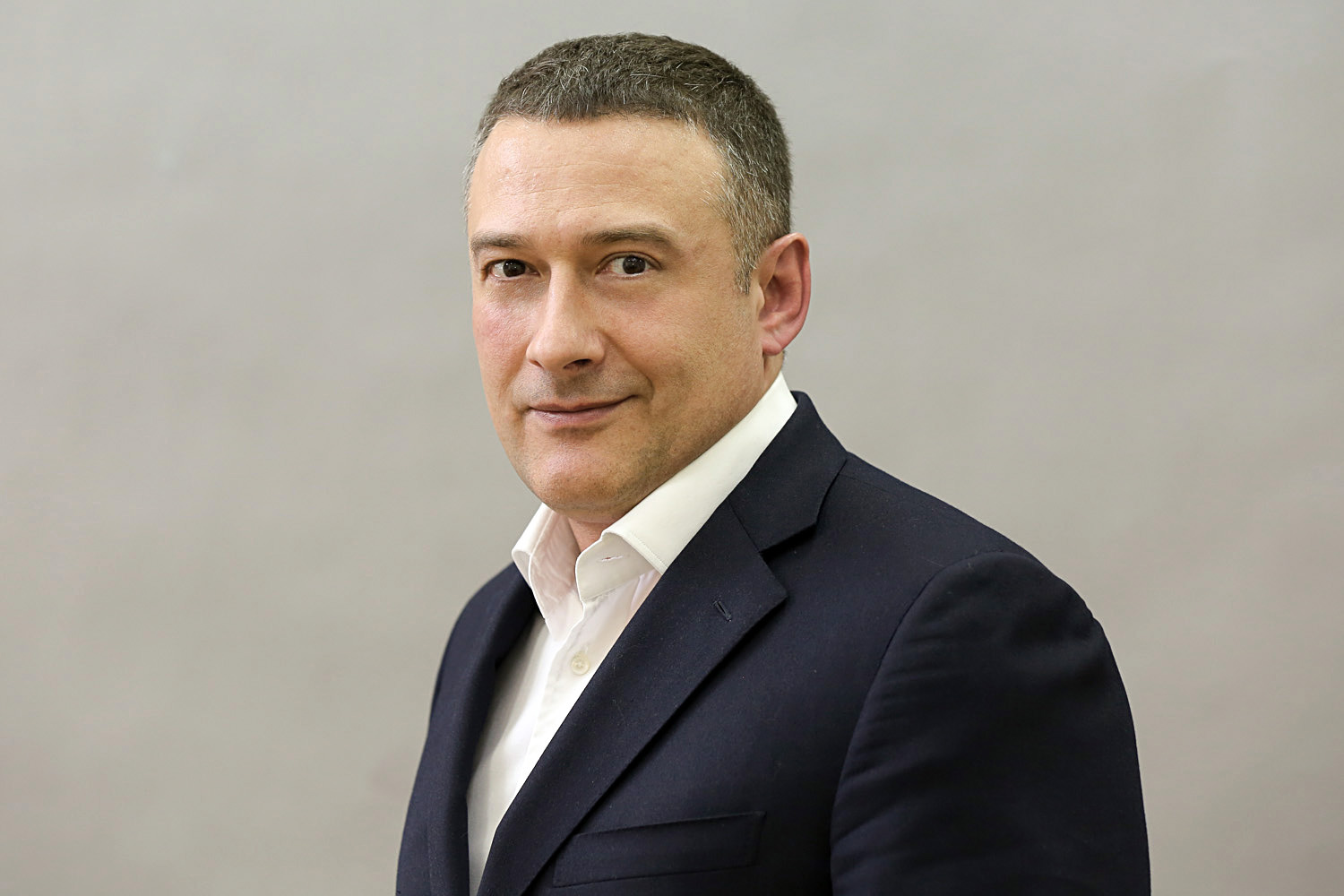
Igor Kozlov, CEO (2016)

Sirius was established in 2009. Its key products include customized and replicated software of various uses, television equipment and devices for television reception, in particular, in extreme conditions (space environment, ultrahigh temperature environment and other hostile environments), automated control system elements, hardware and software for automated special-purpose systems, comprehensive security systems for critical facilities, territories and passenger transportation systems and telecommunication equipment. The company included over 20 enterprises, such as Internavigation Research Center for Advanced Navigation Technologies; JSC Radiozavod; FGUP Solid-State Engineering Construction Bureau; JSC Solnechnogorsk Instrument Plant; JSC Kristall Research Center; JSC Novosibirsk State Design Institute; JSC Novosibirsk Institute for Software Systems; JSC Popov Broadcast Reception and Acoustics Institute; JSC Television Research Institute; JSC Rastr Research Institute for Industrial Television.

As a result of enlargement, restructuring and liquidation, in the period from 2014 to 2016, 70 organizations will be established on the basis of 120 plus organizations of Ruselectronics. According to deputy director of Ruselectronics, basic scenario of the holding company's development strategy implementation envisions its revenues’ growth in 2012–2020 to 130.7 billion roubles ($3.7 billion) from 42.7 billion roubles ($1.2 billion). Quantity of Ruselectronics subsidiaries will be reduced from 123 to 70.

In 2015, Igor Kozlov was appointed as the Chairman of the Directors Board of Ruselectronics while being the Council of the Minister of Telecom and Mass Communications of the Russian Federation. In 2016 Igor Kozlov became the CEO of Ruselectronics. In 2017 Alexey Belinskiy appointed as a director general of JSC "Ruselectronics".

In 2018, Alexey Belinsky leaves the post of interim CEO of Roselectronics Holding. Alexander Borisov, Head of the A. I. Shokin NPP Istok, became acting interim CEO of Roselectronics. In April 2019, Alexander Borisov was appointed CEO of Roselectronics Holding.

State corporation Rostec later announced plans to sell 75% of Ruselectronics shares on IPO.

Ruselectronics is a sanctioned entity appearing on the US Sanctions List following the 2022 invasion of Ukraine by Russia.

== Products ==
Ruselectronics provides semiconductor devices, photo detectors and light emitting elements, displays, emitters, microwave devices and vacuum tubes, electronic materials and structures, and electronic equipment and systems. Its products include diodes; AC and DC plasma display panels, and bar and digital displays, as well as plasma monitors for industrial applications; and co-based and nano alloys, and IR LED chips. The company's products also include millimeter-waverband waveguide isolators and circulators, and ferrite phase shifters; broad and narrow bandwidth, and cryogenic coaxial isolators and circulators; and high-power coaxial circulators. Ruselectronics subsidiaries are also specializing in the development of software-defined radio systems, including SDR systems for naval surface ships. The company supplies the "Serp" line of anti-drone EW systems since 2023.

== Innovation Program ==
In 2014 during annual exhibition Open Innovations Ruselectronics presented a unique rescue solution from high-rises. Ruselectronics subsidiary JSC 'Spetsmagnit' designed a power-independent group escape system (EKSS) for rescuing people from high floors in high-rises based on magnetic eddy-current braking systems – two escape and rescue pods equipped with magnetic systems which interact with an electric strap control bus housed in a separate fireproof shaft placed on the outside of the building.

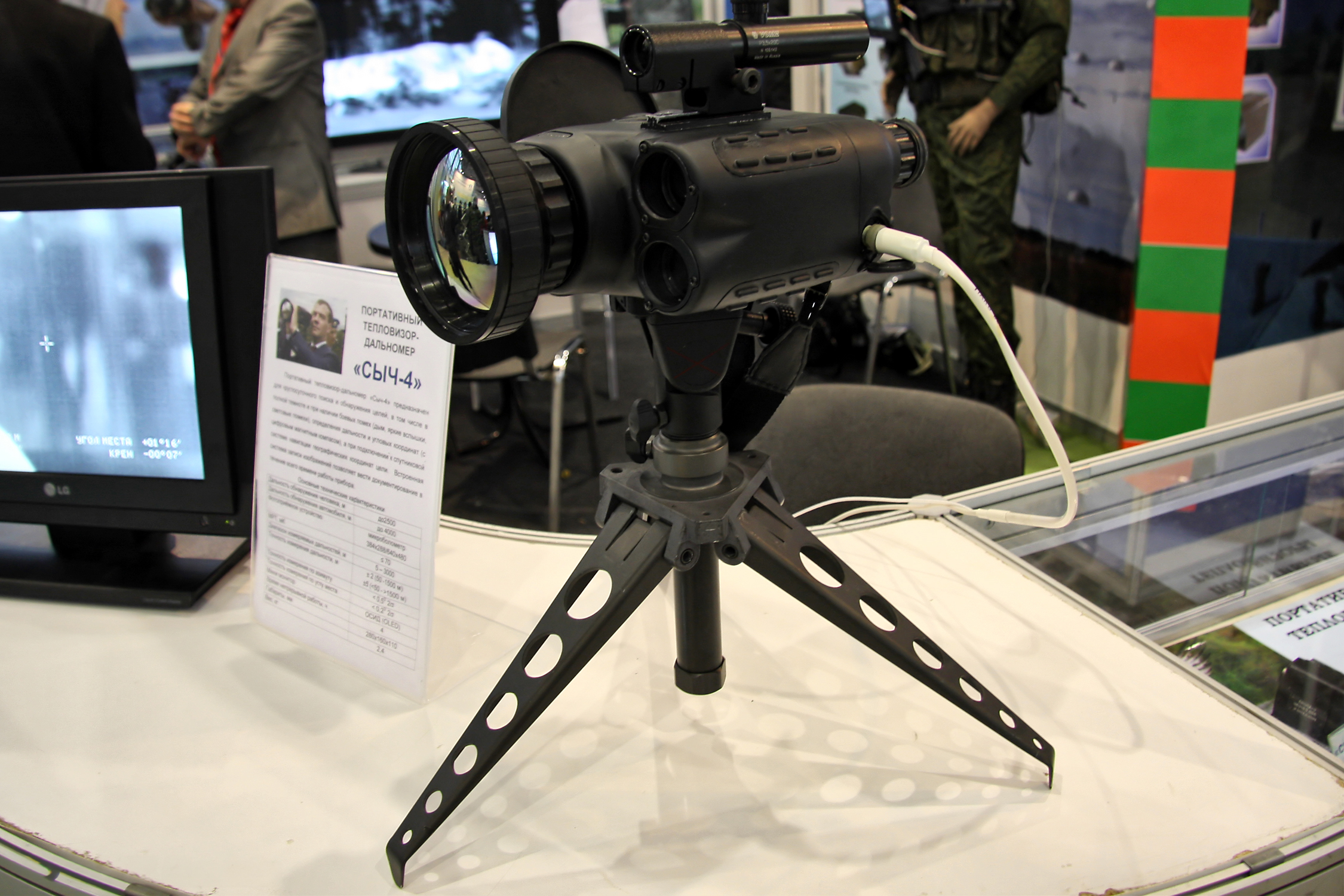
Thermographic camera produced by JSC 'Cyclone', Ruselectronics subsidiary

As an escape pod full of people starts moving down, gravity induces eddy currents in the bus, which generate braking force by interacting with the system's magnetic field. One escape pod can lower up to 25 people at a time from a height of up 100 meters (330 ft) in less than a minute. In the meantime, the second (empty) escape pod connect to the first one, will rise to the top, ready to evacuate the next group of people.

At Interpolitex 2014, the 18th International Exhibition of Technologies and Methods to Ensure National Security, Ruselectronics presented a new mobile command post with thermal imaging cameras for remote observation and surveillance during security operations in areas affected by natural disasters, emergencies caused by technology, and in mass gatherings and potentially volatile crowds:

“The new vehicle-mounted thermal imaging system can be used by Emergency Response during forest fires and by the police in zero visibility. We really want to supply the latest state-of-the-art technologies to people who save other people’s lives,” Ruselectronics CEO Andrey Zverev said.

Another innovative solution at Open Innovations-2014, a technology to apply a protective nanocoating on medical instruments, was presented by another Ruselectronics subsidiary, JSC 'S.A. Vekshinsky Scientific Research Institute for Vacuum Machinery'.

Overall Ruselectronics planned to invest more than $5.8bn in its innovation development between 2014 and 2020.

The new innovation development program will help us boost sales revenues, take our products to the global markets, and make sure Russia gets a foothold in new market segments and ultimately takes a leadership role in a number of technology areas.
Andrey Zverev, Ruselectronics CEO

Ruselectronics has plans to invest more than US$3bn in technical modernization of its assets across Russia and then inject about US$2.3bn in R&D, with the rest going to infrastructure improvements, staff training, and international economic collaboration.

== Joint-ventures ==
=== Alcatel-Lucent ===
In November 2009 Ruselectronics and French Alcatel-Lucent RT (Alcatel-Lucent) entered into a joint venture agreement. The JV was created for development and production of high-tech telecommunication equipment and its promotion in Russian and CIS markets. In 2012 the parties signed long-term collaboration memorandum on research, development and implementation of LTE technologies. According to the memorandum, under Alcatel-Lucent management a new integrated R&D centre will be created in Moscow using Ruselectronics JSC 'Pulsar' facilities as a base.

=== Sumitomo Wiring Systems ===
The joint venture with Japanese Sumitomo Wiring System opened in 2014 in Yekaterinburg on a site of Ruselectronics subsidiary JSC 'Radio Equipment Plant'. The enterprise employs 290 people, a number that is expected to increase to 650 by the end of the 2014, and will produce automotive parts for VAZ, Renault and Nissan.

=== Rohde & Schwarz/ Funkwerk AG ===
In 2011 Ruselectronics created a joint-venture with German company Rohde & Schwarz. Production of Rohde & Schwarz designed base stations of TETRA standard is located on JSC 'Omsky Scientific-Research Institute of semiconductors' facility. Same agreement signed with Funkwerk AG.

=== Tata Power SED ===
In 2014 Orion subbranch of Ruselelectronics signed a memorandum on cooperation with Indian defence company Tata Power SED The parties have agreed to cooperate on the development and production of high-tech products in the area of transport and security infrastructure systems for the Indian civil and military aviation market.

=== CETC International ===
According to Rostec CEO Sergey Chemezov, Ruselectronics is going to build LED-production plant with Chinese corporation CETC within a joint-venture project in special economic zone in Tomsk.

=== China Aerospace Science and Technology Corporation (CASC) ===
In 2014 Rostec and China Aerospace Science and Technology Corporation (CASC) signed an Agreement for a Strategic Cooperation aimed at facilitating cooperation in R&D and production of electronic components, information technology, communications, automation systems and new materials. Ruselectronics will participate in this joint-venture as a Rostec Corporation' electronic equipment suncidiary.

=== ZTE ===
Ruselectronics signed the agreement with ZTE Corporation during Mobile World Congress 2015 in Barcelona. Ruselectronics is seeking to enlarge its activities in the fields of innovative technologies and solutions for the “Smart City, "Smart Transit System", “intelligent transportation system”, and “Intelligent Antenna System” programs. ZTE plans to jointly develop versatile solutions based on GoTa (Global Open Trunking Architecture) technology and digital trunking products. This technology was first implemented to ensure security at the National Games of the People's Republic of China in Jiangsu Province. The system provided secure communications to tens of thousands of subscribers, including games organizers, medical personnel, security officers, and other employees.
Ruselectronics as well has already overseen the successful implementation of the “Safe City” system in a number of Russian cities. For example, in March 2013, Russia's first large-scale information system created on the basis of a domestic hardware and software was introduced in Krasnoyarsk. The system facilitates effective action of operative teams, as well as the prediction and prevention of various incidents and crimes.
The turnover between Ruselectronics and ZTE is expected to reach yuan 1.2 billion.

== Subsidiaries ==
Ruselectronics owns more than 120 companies, including following entities:

=== Machinery Plants ===
- Giricond, JSС, Saint-Petersburg
- Plazma JSC, Ryazan Region
- SRIEEM JSC Kaluga Region
- Telegraph equipment plant JSC Kaluga Region
- RMPCIP JSC, Ryazan Region
- Radiozavod JSC, Perm Region
- Ferrite-Domen Company, JSC Saint-Petersburg
- CIME, JSC Saratov Region
- Cyclone Co, JSC, Moscow
- Optron, JSC Moscow
- Logic JSC, Moscow
- Svetlana JSC, Saint-Petersburg
- Svetlana-Rost CJSC, Saint-Petersburg
- Angstrem, PJSC, Moscow
- Angstrem-M, PJSC, Moscow
- Russian Telecom Equipment Company CJSC, Moscow
- Alagir Resistance Plant JSC, North Ossetia-Alania
- Razryad JSC, North Ossetia-Alania
- GERMANIUM, JSC Krasnoyarsk Region
- GRAN JSC, North Ossetia-Alania
- Omega JSC, Tomsk Region
- Oxid Novosibirsk Radio Component Plant’, Novosibirsk Region
- DZRD JSC, Tula Region
- MARS Factory, JSC Tver Region
- Semi-conductor device plant JSC, Mary El
- IPTD, JSCMoscow
- Nalchik semi-conductor device plant JSC, Kabardino-Balkaria
- Smolensk radio-component plant JSC, Smolensk Region
- Topaz JSC, North Ossetia-Alania
- Lithium-Element JSC, Saratov
- Nyima’ Progress JSC, Moscow
- Pulsar State Plant JSC, Moscow
- JSC SPE Salyut, Nizhny Novgorod Region
- Oktava Plant, JSC Tula
- Specmagnit JSC, Moscow
- Meteor plant JSC, Volgograd Region
- Electron-Optronic JSC, Saint-Petersburg

=== Scientific Production Companies ===
- Inject JSC, Saratov Region
- Thorium FSUE, Moscow
- Cyclone-Test JSC, Moscow Region
- Almaz JSC, Saratov Region
- Vostok JSC, Novosibirsk Region
- Kontakt JSC, Saratov Region
- Istok JSC, Moscow Region
- Pulsar JSC, Moscow
- Rigel JSC, Saint-Petersburg
- Binom JSC, North Ossetia-Alania
- TFP OSTER SPB, Saint-Petersburg

=== Research institutes ===
- Research Institute of Electronic and Mechanical Devices, JSC Penza Region
- Research Institute Electron JSC, Saint-Petersburg
- Research Institute of Technology of Production, JSC, Nizhny Novgorod Region
- Machinery Research Institute, JSC, Smolensk Region
- S.A. Vekshinsky Scientific Research Institute for Vacuum Machinery, JSC, Moscow
- Scientific-Research Institute Electronics JSC, Moscow
- Scientific-Research Institute of EM JSC, North Ossetia-Alania
- Scientific-Research Institute Platan with Plant, JSC, Moscow Region
- Central Scientific-Research Institute Cyclone, JSC, Moscow Region
- Scientific-Research Institute of Electrical Carbon Products, OJSC, Saratov Region
- Scientific-Research Institute of semi-conductor plant, JSC, Tomsk Region
- Scientific-Research Institute Volga JSC, Saratov Region
- Omsky Scientific-Research Institute of semiconductors, JSC, Omsk
- Russian Research Institute Electronstandart, JSC Saint-Petersburg

=== Design Bureaus ===
- Novosibirsk semi-conductor plant and experimental Design Bureau, Novosibirsk Region
- Ikar Design Bureau JSC, Nizhny Novgorod Region
- Special design bureau of relay equipment JSC, Nizhny Novgorod Region
- Central Design Bureau Deiton JSC, Moscow
- MELZ Design Bureau JSC, Moscow

=== Other type of entities ===
- Rosel Trading House, CJSC, Moscow
- Electronintoring Foreign Trade Association JSC, Moscow
- Radioexport Foreign Trade Association, Moscow
- Fryazino special construction and erection department JSC, Moscow Region
- New Light Technologies, CJSC, Moscow
- Svyazdorinvest, JSC, Moscow
- MosElectronProject, JSC, Moscow
- Saratovelectronproject JSC, Saratov Region
- Electron Construction General Management, Moscow
