= Kentucky Electrical Lamp Company =

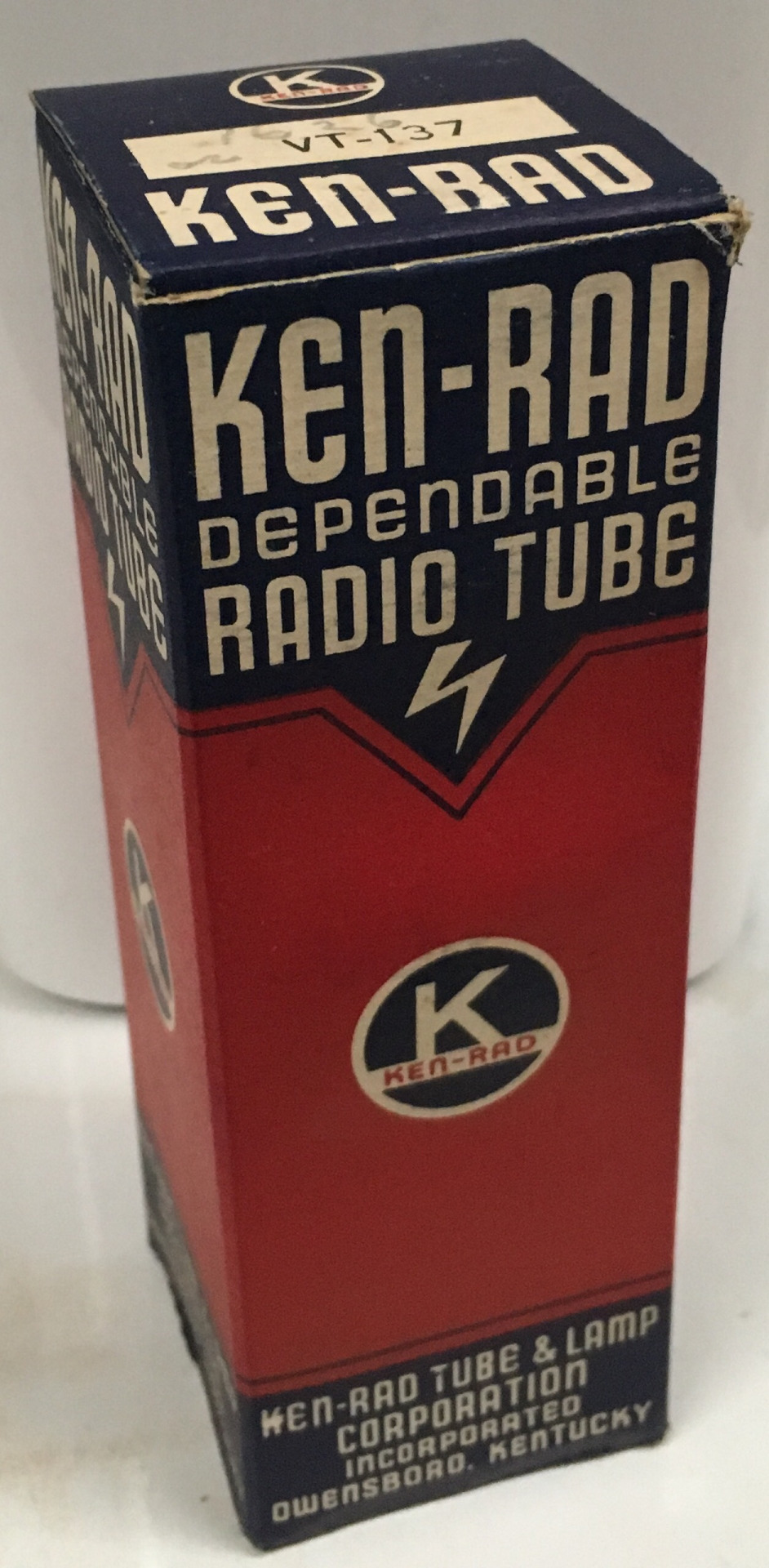
Ken-Rad branded vacuum tube carton

The Kentucky Electrical Lamp Company, based in Owensboro, Kentucky was a pioneering company in the development and manufacturing of incandescent light bulbs.

== History ==
Founded in 1899, the Kentucky Electrical Lamp Company began operations at 817 Lewis Street (later renamed J. R. Miller Blvd., in the 1980s) in Owensboro, Kentucky. The company was sold to Roy Burlew in 1918 who used it to create the Kentucky Radio Corporation, later known as Ken-Rad, which operated out of the same building. Burlew grew the company significantly as the lamp plant continued to grow, Burlew expanded into the manufacturing of vacuum tubes for radios in 1922. Within seven years of purchasing the company it had expanded with plants in Bowling Green, Kentucky and Tell City and Huntingburg, Indiana. The manufacturing company supplied the light bulbs for the first Major League Baseball game played at night. The game was played on May 24, 1935, between the Cincinnati Reds and the Philadelphia Phillies at Cincinnati's Crosley Field. In 1943, Burlew sold the lamp division which he acquired in 1918 for $55,000 to the Westinghouse Electric Corporation in exchange of 35,000 shares of that company's stock valued at $1,600,000.

Ken-Rad secured several government and defense contracts during World War II. The company grew to be very important to the war effort, and when it was threatened by a strike in 1944 it was seized by the Department of War under order of President Roosevelt. In 1945 Burlew sold the remainder of the company, the tube division, to General Electric; this became GE's primary tube making facility as part of its Microwave Products Department. In 1987, the Microwave Products Department was spun off and sold to an investment group, retaining the acronym and becoming MPD Inc.

From 1921 to 2006 the building served as home to Smith Machine and Supply, Inc. The building was torn down in 2007 and the property was repurposed as an Owensboro city park.
