= Fender Princeton Reverb =

Guitar amplifier combo

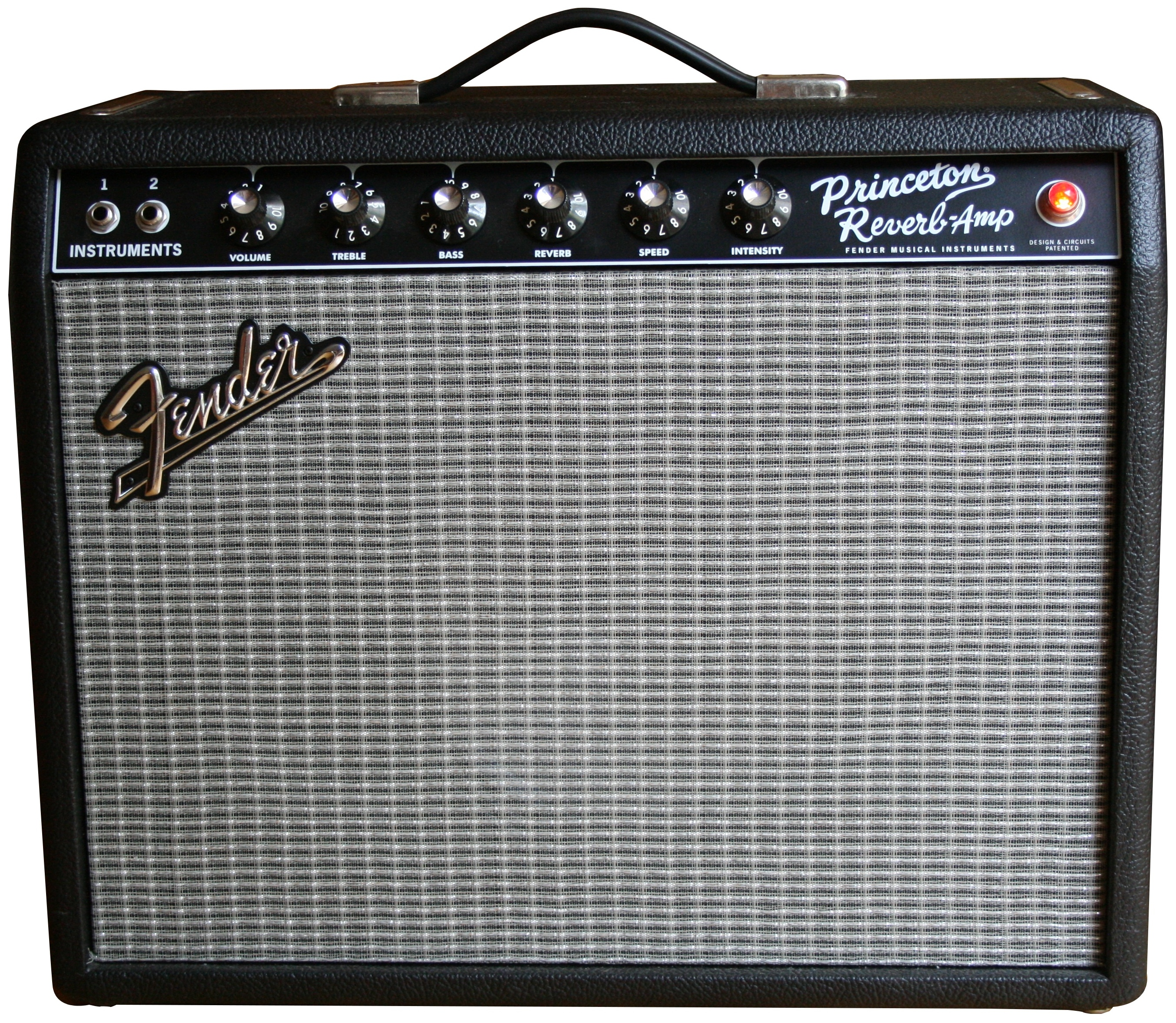
Fender Princeton Reverb Amp 65 Reissue

The Fender Princeton Reverb is a guitar amplifier combo. It is based on the Princeton and includes built-in reverb and vibrato.

== Fender Princeton Reverb ==
The Fender Princeton Reverb is a guitar amplifier combo, essentially a Princeton with built-in reverb and vibrato. The 12 Watt Blackface version was introduced in 1964 and available until 1967; in 1968 it was changed to the Silverface version with a drip edge around the grill cloth. Amps produced after the end of 1969 saw a change in circuitry, the removal of the drip edge and a change in the rectifier from a 5AR4 to a 5U4GB along with a change in bias resistor value; a "boost" pull switch to the volume control pot was added in 1977. In 1980 and 1981 the Silverface version was cosmetically changed back to the Blackface. It was discontinued in 1981.

== Fender Princeton Reverb II ==
This Paul Rivera-specified Fender guitar amplifier was introduced in 1982 to replace the Princeton Reverb. It was a completely different and significantly more powerful amplifier. Designed by Ed Jahns, it featured a built-in reverb, treble boost and mid boost controls, and a switchable lead (overdrive) effect. The Princeton Reverb II was removed from the Fender pricelist in 1986.

The development of the Princeton amplifier, from its inception as a 4-watt practice amp in 1948, can be tracked by working through http://ampwares.com attached to the sales website of the commercial firm "Mojotone".

== Reissue ==
In Summer 2008, Fender reissued the Princeton Reverb. While it is based on the Blackface version, and utilizes a tube rectifier and a tube reverb, it uses printed circuit boards instead of eyelet-style hand-wired circuit boards.

== '68 Custom ==
In Summer 2013, Fender released a redress of the Princeton Reverb reissue with slightly modified circuitry and the drip-edge "silverface" cosmetics introduced on Fender amplifiers in 1968. The model is known as the '68 Custom Princeton Reverb.

== Specifications (Princeton Reverb, 1964–81) ==
- Preamp tubes: one 7025, two 12AX7, one 12AT7
- Output tubes: two 6V6GT, fixed-bias
- Rectifier: 5AR4 (blackface & reissue), GZ34 (blackface), 5U4GB (silverface)
- Controls: volume, treble, bass, reverb, speed, intensity
- Output: 12 to 15 Watts RMS
- Speaker: 10" speaker (Jensen C10R, Jensen C10Q, Jensen C10N, Oxford 10L5 or Oxford 10J4)

== Specifications (Princeton Reverb II, 1982–86) ==
- Preamp tubes: three 7025 (a/k/a 12AX7), one 12AT7
- Output tubes: two 6V6GTA, fixed-bias
- Rectifier: solid-state
- Controls: volume (pull for lead), treble (pull for boost), middle (pull for boost), bass, reverb, lead volume, master volume, presence
- optional 2-button footswitch (lead, reverb)
- Output: 22 Watts RMS
- Speaker: 12" Fender Blue label made by Pyle and later re-sourced from Eminence; factory upgrade option for EV speaker
