= John Desmond Bernal Prize =

Award given to a distinguished scholar in science

The John Desmond Bernal Prize is an award given annually by the Society for Social Studies of Science (4S) to scholars judged to have made a distinguished contribution to the interdisciplinary field of Science and Technology Studies (STS). The award was launched in 1981, with the support of Eugene Garfield.

The award is named after the scientist John Desmond Bernal.

== Award recipients ==
Source: Society for Social Studies of Science

Year	Recipient	Notable works
1981	Derek de Solla Price	Little Science, Big Science
1982	Robert K. Merton	The Sociology of Science
1983	Thomas S. Kuhn	The Structure of Scientific Revolutions
1984	Joseph Needham	Science and Civilisation in China
1985	Joseph Ben-David	The Scientist's Role in Society: A Comparative Study
1986	Michael Mulkay	The Word and the World: Explorations in the Form of Sociological Analysis
1987	Christopher Freeman	The Economics of Industrial Innovation
1988	Dorothy Nelkin	Selling Science: How the Press Covers Science and Technology
1989	Gerald Holton	The Scientific Imagination
1990	Thomas Hughes	Networks of Power: Electrification in Western Society, 1880-1930
1991	Melvin Kranzberg	By the Sweat of Thy Brow: Work in the Western World (with Joseph Gies)
1992	Bruno Latour	Laboratory Life (with Steve Woolgar)
1993	David Edge	Astronomy Transformed (with Michael Mulkay)
1994	Mary Douglas	Natural Symbols
1995	Bernard Barber	Science and the Social Order
1996	David Bloor	Knowledge and Social Imagery
1997	Harry Collins	The Golem: What Everyone Should Know about Science (with Trevor Pinch)
1998	Barry Barnes	Scientific Knowledge and Sociological Theory
1999	Martin J.S. Rudwick	The Great Devonian Controversy: The Shaping of Scientific Knowledge among Gentlemanly Specialists
2000	Donna Haraway	A Cyborg Manifesto: Science, Technology, and Socialist-Feminism in the Late Twentieth Century
2001	Steven Shapin	Leviathan and the Air-Pump: Hobbes, Boyle, and the Experimental Life (with Simon Schaffer)
2002	Michel Callon	The Laws of the Markets
2003	Helga Nowotny	Re-Thinking Science (with Michael Gibbon and Peter Scott)
2004	Sheila Jasanoff	Controlling Chemicals
2005	Donald MacKenzie	Mechanizing proof: computing, risk, and trust
2006	Wiebe Bijker	Of bicycles, bakelites and bulbs: Toward a Theory of Sociotechnical Change
2007	Ruth Schwartz Cowan	A Social History of American Technology
2008	Steve Woolgar	Laboratory Life (with Bruno Latour)
2009	Karin Knorr Cetina	Epistemic Cultures: How the Sciences Make Knowledge
2010	Brian Wynne	Rationality and Ritual: The Windscale Inquiry and Nuclear Decisions in Britain
2011	Evelyn Fox Keller	Reflections on Gender and Science
2012	Adele Clarke	Disciplining Reproduction: American Life Scientists and the 'Problem of Sex'
2013	Sandra Harding	The Science Question in Feminism
2014	Lucy Suchman	Plans and Situated Actions: The Problem of Human-machine Communication
2015	John Law	Power, action, and belief: a new sociology of knowledge
2016	Michael Lynch	Representation in Scientific Practice
2017	Hebe Vessuri	Ciencia, Tecnología y Sociedad en América Latina ("Science, Technology and Society in Latin America")
2018	Trevor Pinch	The Social Construction of Technological Systems: New Directions in the Sociology and History of Technology (with Wiebe Bijker and Thomas P. Hughes)
2019	Emily Martin	The Woman in the Body: A Cultural Analysis of Reproduction (1987), "The Egg and the Sperm: How Science Has Constructed a Romance Based on Stereotypical Male-Female Roles" (1991)
2020	Sharon Traweek	Beamtimes and Lifetimes: The World of High Energy Physicists (1988)
2020	Langdon Winner	Autonomous Technology (1977), "Do Artifacts Have Politics?" (1980), The Whale and the Reactor (1986)
2021	Judy Wajcman	The Social Shaping of Technology (with Donald Mackenzie; 1985), Pressed for Time: The Acceleration of Life in Digital Capitalism (2015)
2021	Nelly Oudshoorn	Beyond the Natural Body (1994), The Male Pill (2003), Telecare and the Transformations of Healthcare (2011)
2022	Arie Rip	Futures of Science and Technology in Society, Nanotechnology and its governance
2022	Troy Duster	Backdoor to Eugenics (2004)
2023	Joan Fujimura	Crafting Science: A Sociohistory of the Quest for the Genetics of Cancer
2023	Warwick Anderson	Collectors of Lost Souls: Turning Kuru Scientists into Whitemen
2024	Geoffrey Bowker	Sorting things out (with Susan Leigh Star),
2024	Anne Marie le Mol	The Body Multiple (2003)

- 2025 - Paul N. Edwards and Anna Lowenhaupt Tsing
- 2026 - Steven Epstein and Ulrike Felt

== See also ==
- List of social sciences awards
