= Interessement =

Term in actor–network theory

The term 'interessement' is French-English, and is synonymous with the word 'interposition'. It was first used by Michel Callon. It is used within the scientific tradition known as actor-network theory, in association with translation and the formation of networks. Various devices can be used in the interessement phase of a translation process, to strengthen the association between actors, and support the structure of the network.
