= Society for Social Studies of Science =

Non-profit scholarly association

- Abbreviation: 4S
- Formation: 1975; 51 years ago
- Type: INGO
- Region served: Worldwide
- Official language: English
- President: Wen-Hua Kuo
- Main organ: Science, Technology, & Human Values
- Parent organization: International Social Science Council (ISSC)
- Website: www.4sonline.org

The Society for Social Studies of Science (4S) is a non-profit scholarly association devoted to the social studies of science and technology (STS). It was founded in 1975 and it has grown considerably over the years. The first conference meeting of 4S was convened in 1976 at Cornell University. In 2024, over 3,000 people attended the society's annual meeting in Amsterdam, co-hosted by the European Association for the Study of Science and Technology (EASST).

Its charter was drafted in 1975, and its first President was the American sociologist Robert K. Merton. 4S is governed by a nine-person council as well as its president.

4S publishes the quarterly academic journal Science, Technology, & Human Values as well as the diamond open access journal Engaging STS, and it organizes an annual conference attended by thousands of scholars from a range of fields including science and technology studies, sociology of science, science studies, history of science, philosophy of science, anthropology of science, economics, political science, and psychology, as well as science educators and scientists.

It awards the Ludwik Fleck Prize annually for "best book in the area of science and technology studies", the Rachel Carson Prize for "a work of social or political relevance", the John Desmond Bernal Prize for an individual who made "a distinguished contribution to the field", the David Edge Prize for "an outstanding peer-reviewed article or book chapter in Science and Technology Studies", and the Nicholas C. Mullins Prize for "outstanding scholarship in science and technology studies" by a graduate student.

== Presidents ==
- 2026-2027 Wen-Hua Kuo
- 2023-2025 Anne Pollock
- 2022-2023 Emma Kowal
- 2020-2021 Alondra Nelson (president-elect; resigned following appointment to the Biden Administration)
- 2020-2021 Joan Fujimura
- 2018-2019 Kim Fortun
- 2016-2017 Lucy Suchman
- 2014-2015 Gary Downey
- 2012-2013 Trevor Pinch
- 2010-2011 Judy Wajcman
- 2008-2009 Michael Lynch
- 2006-2007 Susan Leigh Star
- 2004-2005 Bruno Latour
- 2002-2003 Wiebe Bijker
- 2000-2001 Sheila Jasanoff
- 1998-1999 Michel Callon
- 1996-1997 Karin Knorr-Cetina
- 1994-1995 Sal Restivo
- 1992-1993 Harry Collins
- 1990-1991 Harriet Zuckerman
- 1988-1989 Arie Rip
- 1986-1987 David Owen Edge
- 1984-1985 Nicholas C. Mullins
- 1982-1983 Arnold Thackray
- 1980-1981 Bernard Barber
- 1978-1979 Dorothy Nelkin
- 1976-1977 Warren Hagstrom
- 1975-1976 Robert Merton
