= Problematization =

Process in critical thinking

Problematization is a process of stripping away common or conventional understandings of a subject matter in order to gain new insights. This method can be applied to a term, writing, opinion, ideology, identity, or person. Practitioners consider the concrete or existential elements of these subjects. Analyzed as challenges (problems), practitioners may seek to transform the situations under study. It is a method of defamiliarization of common sense.

Problematization is a critical thinking and pedagogical dialogue or process and may be considered demythicisation. Rather than taking the common knowledge (myth) of a situation for granted, problematization poses that knowledge as a problem, allowing new viewpoints, consciousness, reflection, hope, and action to emerge.

What may make problematization different from other forms of criticism is its target, the context and details, rather than the pro or con of an argument. More importantly, this criticism does not take place within the original context or argument, but draws back from it, re-evaluates it, leading to action which changes the situation. Rather than accepting the situation, one emerges from it, abandoning a focalised viewpoint.

To problematize a statement, for example, one asks simple questions:

- Who is making this statement?
- For whom is it intended?
- Why is this statement being made here, now?
- Whom does this statement benefit?
- Whom does it harm?

== Foucault's concept of problematization ==
For Michel Foucault, problematization serves as the overarching concept of his work in "History of Madness".

He treats it both as an object of inquiry and a specific form of critical analysis. As an object of inquiry, problematization is described as a process of objects becoming problems by being "characterized, analyzed, and treated" as such.

As a form of analysis, problematization seeks to answer the questions of "how and why certain things (behavior; phenomena, processes) became a problem". Foucault does not distinguish clearly problematization as an object of inquiry from problematization as a way of inquiry. Problematization as a specific form of critical analysis is a form of "re-problematization".

=== History of thought ===
Problematization is the core of his "history of thought" which stands in sharp contrast to "history of ideas" ("the analysis of attitudes and types of action") as well as "history of mentalities" ("the analysis of systems of representation"). The history of thought refers to an inquiry of what it is, in a given society and epoch, "what allows one to take a step back from his way of acting or reacting, to present it to oneself as an object of thought and question it as to its meaning, its conditions and its goals". Therefore, thought is described as a form of self-detachment from one's own action that allows "to present it to oneself as an object of thought [and] to question it as to its meaning, its conditions, and its goals". Thought is the reflection of one's own action "as a problem". According to Foucault, the notions of thought and problematization are closely linked: to problematize is to engage in "work of thought". Crucially, then, Foucault implies that our way of reflecting upon ourselves as individuals, as political bodies, as scientific disciplines or other, has a history and, consequently, imposes specific (rather than universal or a priori) structures upon thought.

==== Responses to problems ====
A central element in the problematization analysis are responses to problems. The analysis of a specific problematization is "the history of an answer (…) to a certain situation". However, Foucault stresses that "most of the time different responses [...] are proposed". His analytical interest focuses on finding at the root of those diverse and possibly contrasting answers, the conditions of possibility of their simultaneous appearance, i.e. "the general form of problematization". This sets Foucauldian problematization apart from many other approaches in that it invites researchers to view opposing scientific theories or political views, and indeed contradictory enunciations in general as responses to the same problematization rather than as the manifestations of mutually excluding discourses. It is this level of problematizations and discourses that Foucault refers to when establishing that Foucault's "history of thought" seeks to answer the question of "how [...] a particular body of knowledge [is] able to be constituted?".

==== Engaging in problematization ====
Engaging in problematization entails questioning beliefs held to be true by society. Ultimately, this intellectual practice is "to participate in the formation of a political will". It also carves out elements that "pose problems for politics". At the same time, it also requires self-reflection on behalf of the intellectual, since problematization is to investigate into the ontological question of the present and to determine a distinguishing "element of the present". This element is decisive for the "process that concerns thought, knowledge, and philosophy" in which the intellectual is part of as "element and actor". By questioning the present, or "contemporaneity", "as an event", the analyst constitutes the event's "meaning, value, philosophical particularity" but relies at the same time on it, for he/she "find[s] both [his/her] own raison d’être and the grounds for what [he/she] says" in the event itself.

== Actor-network theory ==
The term also had a different meaning when used in association with actor–network theory (ANT), and especially the "sociology of translation" to describe the initial phase of a translation process and the creation of a network. According to Michel Callon, problematization involves two elements:

1. Interdefinition of actors in the network
2. Definition of the problem/topic/action program, referred to as an obligatory passage point (OPP)

== Criticism ==
In Literary Criticism, An Autopsy Mark Bauerlein writes:

The act of problematizing has obvious rhetorical uses. It sounds rigorous and powerful as a weapon in the fight against lax and dishonest inquiry. Also, for trained critics, problematizing x is one of the easiest interpretative gestures to make. In the most basic instance, all one has to do is add quotation marks to x, to say "Walden is a 'classic'" instead of "Walden is a classic." The scarequotes cause a hesitation over the term and imply a set of other problematizing questions: what is a "classic"? what does it presuppose? in what contexts is it used? what does it do? what educational and political purposes does it serve? Instead of being a familiar predicate in scholarship, one readers casually assimilate without much notice, "classic" now stands out from the flow of discourse. The questions hover around its use and, until they are resolved, the use of "classic" is impaired. Usually, such questions yield ready answers, but their readiness does not cut into the apparent savviness of the critics asking them. This is another advantage of the term "problematize": it is a simple procedure, but it sounds like an incisive investigative pursuit.
