= The Pasteurization of France =

Science and technology studies book by Bruno Latour

- Author: Bruno Latour
- Original title: Les Microbes: guerre et paix
- Translator: Alan Sheridan, John Law
- Language: French
- Publisher: A.M. Métallié, Harvard University Press (English edition)
- Publication date: January 1984
- Publication place: France
- English publication date: 1988
- Pages: 281 (first edition)

The Pasteurization of France (Les Microbes: guerre et paix suivi de Irréductions) is a book by Bruno Latour published in 1984 by A.M. Métaillié, with an English translation by Alan Sheridan and John Law published in 1988 by Harvard University Press. The book provides an account of the adoption and attribution of Louis Pasteur's research on microbes by the French medical establishment as a case study for an early version of actor-network theory, arguing the adoptions of Pasteur's discoveries were contingent on their utility to the potential adopters.

== Summary ==
The Pasteurization of France is split into two sections: the first section ("War and Peace") is a history of the development and adoption of Pasteur's germ theory while the second ("Irreductions") is a theoretical work, structured into numbered clauses and elaborations, which presents an early version of actor-network theory.

=== Guerre et Paix ===
Latour begins by contesting that histories of the science should explain outcomes as the product of "science" or "social forces", claiming he will explain Pasteur's rise to prominence without resorting to "social forces", appealing to technical details, and using only the language provided by the sources examined. Beginning an analogy which will continue throughout this half, Latour likens Louis Pasteur to Napoleon Bonaparte in Tolstoy's War and Peace: not a "great man" whose actions shape history, but someone to whom responsibility for the achievements of others are attributed after the fact. For this first half of the book, Latour relies on the contents of three periodicals contemporary to Pasteur's work: Revue Scientifique, Annales de l'Institut Pasteur, and Concours Médical.

Latour argues the adoption of germ theory by hygienists is not because the theory is correct but because they serve the hygienists' goals by organizing, simplifying, and triaging the countless individual hygienic practices they had developed. Latour generalizes this to argue for a sociology of associations where action is accomplished through the enrolment of other parties aligning their goals with your own. These parties may not be human: Latour treats Pasteur's manipulations of microbes in the lab as a means of recruiting them to carry out his tests and demonstrations. Latour walks through several more accounts from the history of Pasteur's work to demonstrate this principle, including how Pasteur moves through different disciplines of study throughout his career to build his reputation across different fields and how publications serve to attribute to Pasteur the works of the entire Pasteur Institute.

Latour then describes a difference in the uptake of Pasteur's work between military and civilian doctors. The former are eager to use Pasteur's work to reduce illness and death among soldiers to improve their military might, but germ theory interferes with the role of private doctors, due to the conflict between patient confidentiality and public health requiring them to report contagious illness. These clinicians only have cause to adopt germ theory into their practices once it makes itself useful to them in producing diagnostics and vaccines.

In a brief passage between the two halves of the book, Latour argues that there is no separation between "science" and "society". Returning to his initial claim that he would account for Pasteur's rise in the terms of the era without resorting to social or technical explanations, he contests that no explanation can wholly avoid appealing to power relations, but that his account is no more or less valid than others. Latour closes by explicitly drawing a distinction between his own project and the sociology of scientific knowledge.

=== Irréductions ===
This second half consists of a series of aphorisms, interspersed with commentaries and longer interludes (emulating the form of universalizing the arguments made in the first half of the book. This section draws influence from Spinoza's Tractatus Theologico-Politicus.

Latour asserts absolute irreducibility of all things and that disputes are resolved by "tests of strength" based on who can speak for more actants. Any given event is the result of a translation of action through individual actors, and responsibility can only be claimed after the fact. Thus "power" is an illusion produced by this process of attribution, and there are no relations but relations of force.

Latour touches on several arguments which he would expand on in later works, namely the lack of distinction between science and society (in Science in Action) and that modernity has never existed (in We Have Never Been Modern).

== Editions ==
Originally published in French in 1984, an English translation by Alan Sheridan and John Law was released in 1988 as a companion piece to 1987's Science in Action. The English translation was considered well-executed, though Simon Schaffer considered some passages to be tactically altered for the English audience.

=== List of editions ===
- Les microbes: guerre et paix suivi de Irréductions (1984). A.M. Métaillié ISBN 286424300
- The Pasteurization of France. (1988) Harvard University Press. Hardcover. Translated by Alan Sheridan and John Law. ISBN 0674657608
- The Pasteurization of France. (1993) Harvard University Press. Paperback. Translated by Alan Sheridan and John Law. ISBN 0674657616
- Pasteur: guerre et paix des microbes; suivi de Irréductions (2001). Découverte. ISBN 9782707170118

== Reception ==
Reviews of The Pasteurization of France disagreed regarding both the style and substance of Latour's book, with multiple reviewers describing it as controversial.

Latour's writing style (as translated by Law and Sheridan) drew many remarks, both positive and negative. Gary B. Ferngren credited Latour with "a penchant for the striking aphorism" while Harry W. Paul described Irréductions as "dazzling", but Rosalind Williams warned that "Latour speaks a strange and foreign tongue" and Elan Daniel Louis found the book "Often muddled and obscure" and "difficult to follow". Beyond academic circles, The Economist described the book as "... often amusing, and sometimes bizarre".

Within history of science journals Latour's unorthodox approach drew critique for ignoring established methodologies. Latour's choice to examine only three periodicals (characterized by John Forrester as "bold and blinkered") was seen by some as overly limiting, not consideration for the material surrounding these journals. Further, Jacques Léonard took issue with using each of these source texts to imagine hygenicists and doctors separately when these professions had considerable overlap. Steven Shapin suggested that those seeking "a definitive account of Pasteur's research and its institutionalization" turn instead to Gerald Lynn Geison's forthcoming book (The Private Science of Louis Pasteur, released seven years after Shapin's review).

As the beginning of Latour's writing on actor-network theory and his divergence from the strong programme of sociology of scientific knowledge, The Pasteurization of France drew considerable negative response from several adherents. Karin Knorr-Cetina argued that Latour's theory of power was tautological: if others can only be recruited in line with their own interests and victory is achieved through recruitment, what is in their interests can only be determined after the fact (dependent on whether they were recruited). Knorr-Cetina also criticized Latour's theory of being Machiavellian, and unable to account for unexpected or accidental outcomes. Simon Schaffer was deeply critical of Latour's equivalence of human and non-human actors, contending that the approach was not symmetric as Latour argued, and that "Hylozoism stifles an account of laboratory life." Evan Melhado levelled a similar critique of the explanatory potency of Latour's approach, stating that it was wholly dependent on existing accounts of the same events.

== See also ==
- Actor-network theory
- Louis Pasteur
