= Translation (sociology) =

In actor-network theory (ANT), translation is the process that allows a network to be represented by a single entity, which can in itself be an individual or another network. It encompasses all negotiations, intrigues, calculations, and acts of persuasion, thanks to which an actor (or actant) takes authority to speak or act on behalf of other actors. According to ANT, an actor is an actant, something made to act, therefore it includes both human and non-human entities. Non-humans can have interests, they can enroll others, in exactly the same way as humans do.

The concept of translation was developed by the French philosopher Michel Serres, and then applied to sociology by Michel Callon.

== Some elements of translation ==
In 1984, Callon published the influential article "Some elements of a sociology of translation", wherein the progressive development of new social relationships is examined through the constitution of supposed scientific knowledge. Due to the decline of scallop populations across France in the early 1970s, three marine biologists developed a conservation strategy with the intention to preserve the domestication of scallops. The researchers brought three other actors into their study, namely their scientific colleagues, the fishermen of St. Brieuc Bay, and the scallops. The progressive development of social relationships between these actors consists of four phases ('moments of translation') which, taken together, add up to translation:

1. Problematization - the definition of the nature of the problem in a specific situation by an actor (a group or an individual) and the consequential establishment of dependency
2. Interessement - "locking" other actors into the roles that were proposed for them in the actor's approach for resolving that problem
3. Enrolment - the definition and interrelation of the roles that were allocated to other actors in the previous step
4. Mobilization - ensuring that supposed spokespersons for relevant collective entities are properly representative of all members of the network that are acting as a single agent.

In sociology, translation is a process which creates a situation where certain actors control others as a consequence of the displacements and transformations made by an actor. For example, the three researchers established themselves as the obligatory passage point in the network of relationships they were building, which made them indispensable in the network. This constitutes the problematization phase. Interessement is the activity done by, in this case, the three researchers in order to impose and stabilize the identity of the other actors. If successful, this confirms the validity of the problematization phase, as well as the alliances it implies. Ideally, interessement achieves enrolment, in which the three researchers define and interrelate the various roles they allocate to the other actors. Finally, alliances are mobilized when enrolment is transformed into active support.

Sociological translation is a process, never completely accomplished, which may develop into a power struggle in which a few take center stage while other actors are silenced. In Callon's article, due to the obligatory passage point all actors end up being represented by the three researchers who act and speak in their name. As such, other actors became misrepresented by the three researchers. Other actors' dissatisfaction then leads to controversy, which changed the identity and characteristics of the actors and, as a result, the constructed network of relationships disintegrated.
