= Brian Wynne =

British academic in the field of Science and Technology Studies

- Citizenship: United Kingdom
- Education: University of Cambridge
- Occupations: Researcher; University teacher
- Years active: 1974–present
- Employer: Lancaster University
- Awards: John Desmond Bernal Prize (2010)

Brian Wynne is Professor Emeritus of Science Studies and a former Research Director of the Centre for the Study of Environmental Change (CSEC) at the Lancaster University. His education includes an MA (Natural Sciences, Cambridge 1968), PhD (Materials Science, Cambridge 1971), MPhil (Sociology of Science, Edinburgh 1977). His work has covered technology and risk assessment, public risk perceptions, and public understanding of science, focusing on the relations between expert and lay knowledge and policy decision-making.

== Prizes and public engagements ==
He was an inaugural member of the management board and scientific committee of the European Environment Agency, (EEA), (1994-2000) and a special adviser to the House of Lords Science and Technology Select committee Inquiry into Science and Society, (March 2000). He was a member of the London Royal Society's Committee on Science in Society.

He chaired a European Union DG Research expert group on the European Knowledge Society which published in 2007 "Taking European Knowledge Society Seriously: Report of the Expert Group on Science and Governance to the Science, Economy and Society Directorate, Directorate-General for Research, European Commission".

Wynne was awarded the John Desmond Bernal Prize by the Society for Social Studies of Science in 2010.

== Expert and lay knowledge ==
In Wynne's contribution May the Sheep Safely Graze? to the book Risk, Environment and Modernity (1995), he elaborates on the responses of sheep farmers in Cumbria, who had been subjected to administrative restrictions because of radioactive contamination, allegedly caused by the nuclear accident at Chernobyl in 1986. The sheep farmers suffered economical losses, and it turned out that the source of radioactivity was actually the Sellafield nuclear reprocessing complex; thus, the experts who were responsible for the duration of the restrictions were mistaken.

This particular case illustrates how the exercise of scientific interpretation controlled the farmers and furthermore how scientific knowledge neglects specialist lay knowledges, as it defines lay resistances as based on ignorance or irrationality. It also indicates the social basis of scientific knowledge and its public credibility. This is a development in the field of the Risk Society, as developed by Ulrich Beck and Anthony Giddens.

== More Reading ==
- Wynne, B. (1993). Public uptake of science: a case for institutional reflexivity. Public Understanding of Science, 2(4), 321–337.
- Wynne, B. (2014). Further disorientation in the hall of mirrors. Public Understanding of Science, 23(1), 60–70.

== See also ==
- Risk assessment
- Steven Yearley
- Sociology of Scientific Knowledge
