= Adele Clarke =

American sociologist (1945–2024)

- Born: April 1, 1945; Brooklyn, New York City, U.S.
- Died: January 19, 2024 (aged 78); San Francisco, California, U.S.
- Education: Barnard College (BA); New York University (MA)
- Occupations: Sociologist and women's health scholar
- Awards: John Desmond Bernal Prize

Adele Elizabeth Clarke (April 1, 1945 – January 19, 2024) was an American sociologist and women's health scholar. Clarke was considered a leader in the field of science and technology studies. She made significant contributions to sociology, the history of medicine and feminist reproductive studies.

== Career ==
She received a bachelor's degree from Barnard College in 1966 and a master's degree in sociology from New York University in 1970. She studied dance with Deborah Hay and danced in some of Yvonne Rainer's performances. In 1970, Clarke moved to California to teach women's studies at the College of the Redwoods and Sonoma State University. In 1985, she received a doctorate in sociology in 1985 from the University of California, San Francisco. Between 1987 and 1989, she held a postdoctoral fellowship at Stanford University.

Clarke was an early supporter of initiatives to decolonize social studies.

In 1995, Clarke was in a car accident which caused her serious injuries, and she later became disabled.

She was a faculty member in the Department of Social and Behavioral Sciences of the UCSF School of Nursing from 1985 until her retirement in 2013. She received the Leo G. Reeder Award for her contributions to medical sociology in 2015 from the American Sociological Association and was an editorial board member of East Asian Science, Technology and Society from 2007 to 2019.

== Selected publications ==
- Clarke, Adele E.; Fujimura, Joan H., eds. (1992). The Right Tools for the Job: At Work in Twentieth-Century Life Sciences. Princeton, New Jersey: Princeton University Press. ISBN 978-0-691-08581-4.
- Ruzek, Sheryl Burt; Olesen, Virginia L.; Clarke, Adele E., eds. (1997). Women's Health: Complexities and Differences. Columbus: Ohio State University Press. ISBN 978-0-8142-0704-8.
- Clarke, Adele E.; Olesen, Virginia L., eds. (1998). Revisioning Women, Health and Healing: Feminist, Cultural, and Technoscience Perspectives. New York: Routledge. ISBN 978-0-415-91845-9.
- Clarke, Adele E. (1998). Disciplining Reproduction: Modernity, American Life Sciences, and the Problems of Sex. Berkeley: University of California Press. ISBN 978-0-520-20720-2.
- Clarke, Adele E. (2005). Situational Analysis: Grounded Theory After the Postmodern Turn. Thousand Oaks, California: SAGE Publications. ISBN 978-0-7619-3055-6.
- Morse, Janice M.; Stern, Phyllis Noraeger; Corbin, Juliet; Bowers, Barbara; Clarke, Adele E.; Charmaz, Kathy (2009). Developing grounded theory: the second generation. Walnut Creek, California: Left Coast Press. ISBN 978-1-59874-192-6.
- Clarke, Adele E.; Mamo, Laura; Fosket, Jennifer Ruth; Fishman, Jennifer R.; Shim, Janet K., eds. (2010). Biomedicalization: Technoscience, Health, and Illness in the U.S. Durham, North Carolina: Duke University Press. ISBN 978-0-8223-4553-4.
- Bowker, Geoffrey C.; Timmermans, Stefan; Clarke, Adele E.; Balka, Ellen, eds. (2015). Boundary Objects and Beyond: working with Leigh Star. Cambridge, Massachusetts: MIT Press. ISBN 978-0-262-02974-2.
