= Helen Verran =

Australian historian

Helen Verran is an Australian historian and empirical philosopher of science, primarily working in the Social Studies of Science and Technology (STS), and currently adjunct professor at Charles Darwin University.

== Background ==
Verran is from New South Wales, Australia. She trained as a scientist and teacher in the 1960s (BSc, DipEd, University of New England) and has a PhD in metabolic biochemistry (UNE, 1972). She then spent eight years lecturing in science education at Obafemi Awolowo University in Ifẹ, southwestern Nigeria. In the 1980s she became a lecturer and later associate professor at the University of Melbourne, working in a unit dedicated to the study of history and philosophy of science. She retired in 2012. On retiring she became adjunct professor at the Northern Institute, Charles Darwin University in Darwin, where she still teaches.

== Scholarship ==
=== Numbers and Enumerated Entities ===
Verran's book, Science and an African Logic (University of Chicago Press, 2001), received the Ludwik Fleck Prize in 2003. It analyses counting, and its relation to the ontology of numbers based on her lengthy field observations as a mathematics lecturer and teacher in Nigeria. The book draws on her sudden realisation of the radically different nature of Yoruba counting, and discusses how this realisation grounded her post-relativist theorising. Verran continues to nuance analytics of numbers and numbering as social and material practice (e.g. in the 2018 special issue After Numbers? Innovations in Science and Technology Studies’ Analytics of Numbers and Numbering).

=== Actor-network theory (ANT) ===
She contributed to actor-network theory, working with British sociologist John Law. Specifically, she is credited for contributing with postcolonial studies to nuancing STS. Her work is also seen as part of ANT's ontological turn.

=== Post-colonial STS ===
Her work on Yolngu Aboriginal Australians understandings of the world, their use of technology, and their knowledge systems ranges from the 1990s to current engagement. Together with Michael Christie she has theorised digital knowledge technologies.

Starting with work on alternative modes of knowing nature management through fire, Verran's recent work contributed to social studies of ecosystem services.

== Publications ==
- List of publications
- Downloads at academia.edu
- profile and Download at researchgate
