= Johan Schot =

Dutch historian (born 1961)

Johannes Willem "Johan" Schot (born 4 February 1961) is a Dutch historian working in the field of science and technology policy. A historian of technology and an expert in sustainability transitions, Johan Schot is Professor of Global Comparative History at the Centre for Global Challenges, Utrecht University. He is the Academic Director of the Transformative Innovation Policy Consortium (TIPC) and former Director of the Science Policy Research Unit (SPRU) at the University of Sussex. He was elected to the Royal Netherlands Academy of Arts and Sciences (KNAW) in 2009. He is the Principal Investigator of the Deep Transitions Lab.

== Biography ==
After his studies at Erasmus University Rotterdam, Schot became a consultant in 1985 at the TNO Centre for Technology and Policy Studies. He completed his Phd at the University of Twente in 1991 on the 'Societal Shaping of Technical Change: Constructive Technology Assessment as a form of Luddism' and then he served as an assistant professor, then associate professor at Twente until 1999. He was made part-time Professor in the Social History of Technology at the Eindhoven University of Technology in 1998 and subsequently at Twente in 1999. In 2002 the Netherlands Organisation for Scientific Research awarded him a research grant under the Innovational Research Incentives scheme for talented scholars (highest category) to establish his own research program. In 2003 he was appointed full-time Professor in the History of Technology/Transitions Studies at the Eindhoven University of Technology. From September 2010 until July 2011 he worked as a fellow at the Netherlands Institute for Advanced Studies in the Humanities and Social Sciences in Wassenaar, writing and editing a six-volume book series. The book series entitled Making Europe: Technology and Transformation 1850-2000, was published by Palgrave Macmillan in 2013. In January 2014, Johan Schot was appointed Director of the Science Policy Research Unit at the University of Sussex. A year later he won the 2015 Leonardo da Vinci Medal of the Society for the History of Technology for his outstanding contribution to the history of technology. In January 2019, Johan Schot returned to the Netherlands to start his new role as Professor in Global Comparative History at the Centre for Global Challenges at Utrecht University. Since October 2023, he is the Principal Investigator of the Deep Transitions Lab.

== Research ==
Professor Schot's current research focuses on the conceptualisation and historical interpretation of Deep Transitions. Such transitions refer to long term change processes which transform the economy and society. The First Deep Transition started in 1750 and resulted in the welfare state. The Second Deep Transition started somewhere in the 1970s and is transforming capitalism and modernity as we know it. Building upon the insights of Christopher Freeman and Carlota Perez, the aim is to develop a new version of the Multi-level Perspective (MLP) of Sustainability Transitions that is able to capture the nature and dynamics of Deep Transitions. Professor Schot will also use this new theory to generate insights for the governance of new transition pathways.

In November 2022, Schot initiated a collaboration between historians, sustainability transitions scholars, futurists and a cohort of 16 public and private investors from around the world. The group published a Transformative Investment Philosophy proposing new principles, tools and metrics for financing long-term system change and a deep transition towards sustainability. Following the launch, the Deep Transitions Lab opened in October 2023. Using the Transformative Investment Philosophy, the lab aims to establish a niche in the finance industry and contribute to its scaling. The lab helps organisations move away from a case-by-case focus that favours system optimisation and instead directs investments towards the root causes of unsustainable practices that increase social inequality.

In this research, Professor Schot builds upon his ability to draw insights from the history of technology, evolutionary economics, as well as science and technology studies. In the past, he was instrumental in developing and extending the niche theory of radical change into the influential MLP on sustainability transitions, working with Arie Rip, Frank Geels and others. He was also key in establishing a new framework for research and policy around sustainable technologies, called Strategic Niche Management, building on his earlier influential work on the Constructive Technology Assessment framework. In addition, Professor Schot has co-developed a range of new concepts for the contextual history of technology, such as the mediation junction, the innovation junction, technocratic internationalism, and the hidden integration and fragmentation of Europe.

Johan Schot's work has greatly benefited from an emphasis on creative collaborations across borders and disciplines which open up innovative new research agendas. He has created and pioneered large scale collaborations, in which many (up to 100 or more) scholars and practitioners from business, government and societal groups work productively together. Initiatives such as the Greening of Industry Network and the influential Dutch Knowledge Network for System Innovations and Transitions have all successfully enabled the development of innovative new insights and transformative practices. The Tensions of Europe collaboration of up to 300 scholars resulted in the dynamic ‘Inventing Europe’ digital history project, delivered in partnership with ten cultural heritage institutions and museums. This transnational collaboration also led to a unique book series, called ‘Making Europe’, which provides new interpretations of European History through the lens of technology.

== Books ==
=== Making Europe ===
Edited by Johan Schot and Philip Scranton of Rutgers University (USA), the Making Europe book series investigates the question of ‘Who built Europe?’ by charting the people and ideas, goods and technologies that spread between countries— and between continents. It is the result of a collective effort of an international team of authors and researchers, initiated in 1999 by researchers from Eindhoven University of Technology and the Dutch Foundation for the History of Technology. Fifteen years later the initiative is supported by an international group of renowned universities, research institutes, museums of science and technology, business and industry, and public organizations.

In 2014, the series was awarded the prestigious Freeman Award by the European Association for the Study of Science and Technology (EASST). The Freeman Award is given in recognition of a publication, which reflects a significant collective contribution to the interaction of science and technology studies with the study of innovation. The prize is awarded by EASST in honour of Chris Freeman, founder of SPRU.

=== Technology and the Making of the Netherlands ===
This book, which synthesizes findings originally presented in a series of seven volumes published in the Netherlands, uses the idea of contested modernization as an overarching concept through which to understand Dutch technological history. The modernizers of Dutch society—including engineers, management consultants, architects, and others—did not always agree on how to modernize; moreover, the unruliness of specific practices often derailed or redirected implementation. Tensions between top-down and bottom-up modernization, and between scale-enlargement and more flexible arrangements of mutual coordination and cooperation shaped Dutch history. The chapters examine such topics as attempts to create an industrial nation, new infrastructures; the coming of mass production and the emergence of a consumer society; and land-use planning in a low-lying country.

=== Transformative Investment ===
In November 2022, Schot initiated a collaboration between historians, sustainability transitions scholars, futurists and a cohort of 16 public and private investors from around the world. The group published a Transformative Investment Philosophy proposing new principles, tools and metrics for financing long-term system change and a deep transition towards sustainability. By leveraging the insights of the Deep Transitions framework, Transformative Investment aims to enable and accelerate systems change.

== Key publications ==
=== Deep Transitions ===
- Phil Johnstone and Johan Schot, 'Shocks, institutional change, and sustainability transitions' (2023), volume 120, issue 47.
- Caetano C. R. Penna, Johan Schot and W. Edward Steinmueller, 'Transformative investment: New rules for investing in sustainability transitions' (2023), Environmental Innovation and Societal Transitions, volume 49.
- Johan Schot and W. Edward Steinmueller, 'Three frames for innovation policy: R&D, systems of innovation and transformative change' (2018), Research Policy, volume 47, issue 9, pages 1554-1567.
- Johan Schot and Laur Kanger, 'Emergence, acceleration, stabilization and directionality' (2018), Research Policy, Volume 47, Issue 6, Pages 1045-1059.

=== Niches ===
- Johan Schot and Frank Geels, 'Niches in Evolutionary Theories of Technical Change', Journal of Evolutionary Economics (2007), 17 (5), 605–622.
- Johan Schot, 'The Usefulness of Evolutionary Models for Explaining Innovation. The Case of the Netherlands in the Nineteenth Century', History and Technology (1998), 14, 173–200.

=== Strategic Niche Management ===
- Johan Schot and Frank Geels, 'Strategic Niche Management and Sustainable Innovation Journeys: Theory, Findings, Research agenda, and Policy', Technology Analysis & Strategic Management (2008), 20 (5), 537–554.
- René Kemp, Johan Schot and Remco Hoogma, 'Regime Shifts to Sustainability Through Processes of Niche Formation. The Approach of Strategic Niche Management', Technology Analysis & Strategic Management (1998), 10 (2), 175–195.

=== Multi-level Perspectives ===
- Johan Schot and Frank Geels, 'Typology of Sociotechnical Transition Pathways', Research Policy (2007), 36 (3), 399–417.
- Hugo van Driel and Johan Schot, 'Radical Innovation as a Multilevel Process: Introducing Floating Grain Elevators in the Port of Rotterdam', Technology and Culture (2005), 46 (1), 51–77.

=== Constructive Technology Assessment ===
- Johan Schot, 'Towards New Forms of Participatory Technology Development', Technology Analysis & Strategic Management (2001), 13 (1), 39–52.
- Johan Schot and Arie Rip, 'The Past and Future of Constructive Technology Assessment', Technological Forecasting and Social Change, (1997), 54 (2-3), 251–268.
- Arie Rip, Thomas J. Misa, and Johan Schot, Managing Technology in Society: The Approach of Constructive Technology Assessment. London: Pinter, 1995.

=== Mediation Junction ===
- Gijs Mom, Peter Staal and Johan Schot, 'Civilizing Motorized Adventure, Touring and Automobile Clubs as Intermediaries in the Emergence of the Automobile in The Netherlands', in: Ruth Oldenziel, Adri Albert de la Bruhèze and Onno de Wit (eds.), Manufacturing Technology/Manufacturing Consumers (Amsterdam: Aksant 2009), 139-158 (book chapter).
- Johan Schot and Adri Albert de la Bruhèze, 'The Mediated Design of Products, Consumption and Consumers in the Twentieth Century', in: Nelly Oudshoorn and Trevor Pinch (eds.), How Users Matter: The Co-Construction of Users and Technology (Cambridge: MIT Press 2003), 229-246 (book chapter).

=== Innovation Junction ===
- O. de Wit, J. van den Ende, J. Schot and E. van Oost, 'Innovation Junctions: Office Technologies in the Netherlands, 1880-1980', Technology and Culture (2002), 43 (1), 50–72.

=== Technocratic Internationalism ===
- Johan Schot and Frank Schipper, 'Experts and European Transport Integration 1945-1958', Journal of European Public Policy (2011), 18 (2), 274–293.
- Johan Schot and Vincent Lagendijk, 'Technocratic Internationalism in the Interwar Years: Building Europe on Motorways and Electricity Networks', Journal of Modern European History (2008), 6 (2), 196–216.

=== Hidden Integration ===
- Thomas J. Misa and Johan W. Schot, 'Inventing Europe: Technology and the Hidden Integration of Europe', History and Technology (2005), 21 (1), 1-20. DOI

== Awards and recognition ==
- Honorary degree for History of Technology from Nova University of Lisbon 2017
- Leonardo da Vinci medal 2015
- Freeman Award 2014 (for Making Europe series)
- Royal Netherlands Academy of Arts and Sciences Membership
- Fernand Braudel Fellowship, European University Institute, History and Civilisation Department (12 months)
- Elected to Honours Teaching Staff of the Eindhoven University of Technology
- VICI Award. National competition for talented scientists highest category, Netherlands Organization for Scientific Research
- Senior Research Edelstein Fellowship of the Sidney Edelstein Foundation, Hebrew University of Jerusalem.
- Prof.dr.ir. R.J. Forbes Prize for young scholars in the history of technology.
