= Madeleine Akrich =

French sociologist (born 1959)

- Born: March 4, 1959 (age 67); Boulogne-Billancourt
- Occupation: Sociologist
- Organization: Office parlementaire d'évaluation des choix scientifiques et technologiques
- Known for: Science and technology studies, Actor-Network Theory
- Notable work: "The de-scription of technical objects" (1992)
- Awards: Médaille d'argent du CNRS (2016) Officier de l'ordre national du Mérite(2017)

Madeleine Akrich (born 4 March 1959) is a French sociologist of technology. She served as the director of the Center for the Sociology of Innovation at Mines ParisTech from 2003 to 2013. She is known for developing actor–network theory (ANT) with Bruno Latour, Michel Callon, John Law and others.

== Research ==
Akrich's work concerns the sociology of technology and has been influential in Science and technology studies (STS). She developed actor–network theory, a theoretical approach to social analysis, alongside Michel Callon, Bruno Latour, John Law, and others.

Akrich primarily studies users' relationships with various technologies, with a focus on technologies of obstetric medicine and, in recent collaboration with Cécile Méadel, online health discussion forums.

Script analysis is another STS methodology developed by Akrich. The term "script" is "a metaphor for the 'instruction manual' she claims is inscribed in an artifact. This is related to Don Norman's concept of affordances, but more comprehensive, and has been applied both in STS and adjacent disciplines such as design, internet research and management.

In 2016, Akrich received the CNRS Silver Medal.

== Notable publications ==
- Madeleine Akrich, Cécile Méadel and Vololona Rabeharisoa, Se mobiliser pour la santé. Des associations s'expriment, Paris, Presses des mines, 2009.
- Madeleine Akrich & Cécile Méadel, "De l'interaction à l'engagement: les collectifs électroniques, nouveaux militants dans le champ de la santé," Hermès, n°47, 2007.
- Madeleine Akrich, Bruno Latour, & Michel Callon (ed.), Sociologie de la traduction : textes fondateurs, Paris, Mines Paris, les Presses, "Sciences sociales," 2006. ISBN 2-911762-75-4
- Madeleine Akrich, Vololona Rabeharisoa, P. Jamet, Cécile Méadel & F. Vincent (ed.), La Griffe de l'ours. Débats et controverses en environnement, Paris, Presses de l'École des Mines, 2002.
- Madeleine Akrich & Françoise Laborie, De la contraception à l'enfantement. L'offre technologique en question, Paris; Montréal (Québec), l'Harmattan, 1999. ISBN 2-7384-8476-X
- Madeleine Akrich & Bernike Pasveer, Comment la naissance vient aux femmes. Les techniques de l'accouchement en France et aux Pays-Bas, Le Plessis-Robinson, Synthélabo, "Les Empêcheurs de penser en rond," 1996. ISBN 2-908602-74-1
- Madeleine Akrich, L. Bibard, Michel Callon et al. (ed.), Ces réseaux que la raison ignore, Paris, l'Harmattan, "Logiques sociales," 1992. ISBN 2-7384-1293-9
- Madeleine Akrich, "The De-Scription of Technical Objects" in Shaping Technology / Building Society: Studies in Sociotechnical Change, 1992.
