= Arie Rip =

Dutch social scientist and professor

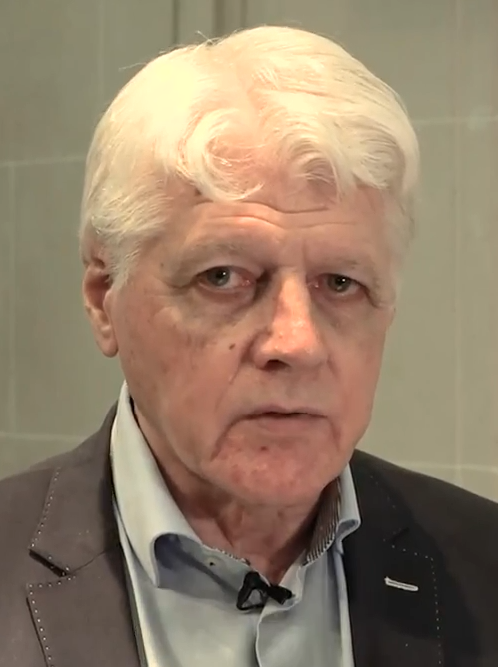
- Rip in 2015
- Born: 13 June 1941 (age 85); Kethel en Spaland

Academic work
- Main interests: Social science

Arie Rip (born 13 June 1941, in Kethel en Spaland) is a Dutch professor emeritus of Philosophy of Science and Technology.

== Career ==
During 1988–1989 he was the President of the international Society for Social Studies of Science. From 2000 until 2005 he was the head of WTMC, the Netherlands Graduate School of Science, Technology and Modern Culture. The WTMC is a formal collaboration of Dutch researchers studying the development of science, technology and modern culture. In 2006 Rip formally retired as the Professor of Philosophy of Science and Technology at the University of Twente, a position he held since 1987. He has published extensively on various topics concerning the philosophy and sociology of scientific and technological developments, and on science and innovation policy. Rip has, for example, introduced the widely used Constructive Technology Assessment method. Currently he is among others a Professor at the University of Stellenbosch in South Africa.

Rip became chairman of the Society for the Study of Nanoscience and Emerging Technologies (S-NET) in 2008.

In 2022 Rip received for his oeuvre the John Desmond Bernal Prize of the Society for Social Studies of Science (4S), which will be awarded to him in the second week of December, 2022, during a meeting of the Society at the Universidad Iberoamericana Puebla in San Andrés Cholula, Puebla, Mexico.

== Key publications ==
- Arie Rip (1981) Maatschappelijke Verantwoordelijkheid van Chemici, PhD-thesis Leiden University, Leiden
- Law, John; Callon, Michel; Rip, Arie (1986). Mapping the dynamics of science and technology: sociology of science in the real world. Basingstoke: Macmillan. ISBN 978-0-333-37223-4.
- Arie Rip (1994) The republic of science in the 1990s, Higher Education, Vol. 28, pp. 3–23
- Arie Rip, Thomas Misa, and Johan Schot (eds.) (1995) Managing Technology in Society: The Approach of Constructive Technology Assessment, Pinter, London/New York. ISBN 1-85567-340-1
- Johan Schot and Arie Rip (1996) The past and future of constructive technology assessment, Technological Forecasting and Social Change, Vol 54, pp. 251–268
- Arie Rip (1997) A cognitive approach to the relevance of science, Social Science Information, Vol. 36 (4), pp. 615–640
- Harro van Lente and Arie Rip (1998) The rise of membrane technology: from rhetorics to social reality, Social Studies of Science, Vol. 28 (2), pp. 221–254
- René Kemp, Arie Rip and Johan Schot (2001) Constructing transition paths through the management of niches, In: Garud, R., Karnoe, P. (Eds.), Path Dependence and Creation, pp. 269–302
- Arie Rip (2002) Science for the 21st century. In: Tindemans, P., Verrijn-Stuart, A., Visser, R. (Eds.), The Future of Science and the Humanities, Amsterdam University Press, Amsterdam, pp 99–148
- Stefan Kuhlmann and Arie Rip (2018) Next-Generation Innovation Policy and Grand Challenges Science and public policy Vol. 45 (4); pp 448–454; https://doi.org/10.1093/scipol/scy011
