= Joseph Ben-David =

Israeli sociologist (1920–1986)

- יוסף בן-דוד
- Born: József Gross; August 19, 1920; Győr, Hungary
- Died: January 12, 1986 (aged 65); Jerusalem, Israel
- Education: Hebrew University of Jerusalem
- Spouse: Miriam
- Children: 3
- Awards: Fellow at the Center for Advanced Study in the Behavioral Sciences (1957–8); Borden Prize from the American Council on Education (1972); John Desmond Bernal Prize
- Scientific career
- Fields: Sociology of Science
- Institutions: Hebrew University of Jerusalem; University of Chicago
- Thesis: The social structure of the professions in Israel (1955)

Joseph Ben-David (Hebrew: יוסף בן-דוד; August 19, 1920 – January 12, 1986) was a Hungarian-born Israeli sociologist who was involved in the sociology of science.

== Biography ==
Ben-David was born József Gross in Győr, Hungary, on August 19, 1920. He moved to Jerusalem, Mandatory Palestine (later Israel) in 1941. He received his M.A. degree in the history and sociology of culture in 1950 and his Ph.D. in sociology in 1955, both from the Hebrew University of Jerusalem. From 1950 until his death, he taught at the Hebrew University of Jerusalem, where he served as the George S. Wise Professor of Sociology and head of the Sidney M. Edelstein Center at the time of his death. He also joined the faculty of the University of Chicago in 1968, where he was named the Stella M. Rowley Professor of Education and Sociology in 1979. He died in Jerusalem on January 12, 1986, after a long battle with cancer.

== Honors and awards ==
Ben-David was a fellow at the Center for Advanced Study in the Behavioral Sciences from 1957 to 1958. He was named a foreign honorary member of the American Academy of Arts and Sciences in 1971 and a fellow of the American Association for the Advancement of Science in 1980. He received the Borden Prize from the American Council on Education in 1972, and was a member of the Institute for Advanced Study in Princeton, New Jersey in 1976.

== Major works ==
Ben-David authored many foundational works. He is best known for his books The scientist’s role in society and Centers of Learning: Britain, France, Germany, United States.
