= Transition management (governance) =

Governance approach

Transition management is a governance approach that aims to facilitate and accelerate sustainability transitions through a participatory process of visioning, learning and experimenting. In its application, transition management seeks to bring together multiple viewpoints and multiple approaches in a 'transition arena'. Participants are invited to structure their shared problems with the current system and develop shared visions and goals which are then tested for practicality through the use of experimentation, learning and reflexivity. The model is often discussed in reference to sustainable development and the possible use of the model as a method for change.

Key principles to transition management as a form of governance:

- seeks to widen participation by taking a multi-actor approach in order to encompass societal values and beliefs
- takes a long-term perspective (between 1-3 generations) creating a basket of visions in which short-term objectives can be identified
- focused on learning at the niche level, experiments are used to identify how successful a particular pathway could be and uses the concept of "Learn by doing, doing by learning"
- a systems thinking approach which identifies that problems will span multiple domains, levels and actors.

== History ==
There have been numerous societal transitions in the past, studied examples include the transition from horse-drawn carriage to motorised cars and the change from physical telegraphy to the electric telephone. There are a number of theories that muse over how transition management evolved into being. One school of thought identifies the sociological aspect of transition as deeply rooted within population dynamics and the evolution of society from high birth rate/high death rate to low birth rate/low death rate. Other theorists consider that transition management has its basis within systems theory and the co-evolution of social and technical factors within the system. Most agree that the shift in the political landscape, from a centralised government to a more liberal, market-based structure has allowed new forms of bottom-up governance styles to rise to prominence and a break from dominant approaches. The most notable use of Transition Management can be established through its development into a practical tool by the Dutch Government to manage the radical transformation of their energy systems in the early 2000s. It was introduced into national policy in the Netherlands in the fourth National Environmental Policy Plan based on a report by Jan Rotmans, Rene Kemp, Frank Geels, Geert Verbong and Marjolein van Asselt.

== Definition ==
Transition management is an approach for tackling the complex issue of sustainable development. Sustainable development in itself is a dynamic, multi-dimensional, multi-actor and multi-level problem that is in a constant state of flux. Critics consider that the current political system is insufficiently equipped to deal with the complexity of the issue and that incremental changes will not address the fundamental system failures that underpin the issue. As an alternative to traditional politics, Transition Management will seek to steer development in a more sustainable direction by identifying and fundamentally restructuring the unsustainable systems that underpin our society. The goal of transition management is geared towards enabling, facilitating and guiding the social, technical and political transformations required by embedded societal systems to bring about sustainability. The need for such a model of governance has arisen through the persistence of problems which have developed to span multi-actors, multi-levels and multi-domains. The inherent complexity of society (from the difference of perspectives, norms and values) added to the intricacy of modern-day issues requires a new form of governance. Therefore, transition management recognises the need to address this problem on the multiple levels and dimensions in which it manifests. The approach seeks to widen participation by encouraging bottom-up approaches that are supported in a top-down manner. The synergy gained from utilising transition management to provide a novel approach to the complex issue of Sustainable Development could be essential if progress is to be made on the issue.

Unlike traditional forms of regulation that use command and control techniques, transition management does not seek to control the uncertainties of change but steer, indirectly influence and redirect the choices of actors towards sustainability. In the long-term, transition management will seek to completely transform the system through the process of creative destruction, much of the literature considers that only the radical rebuilding of our society's systems will be able to transcend the stable lock-in to unsustainable systems which has been systematically reinforced by aspects of the landscape and regime levels.

=== Levels within sociotechnical systems ===
Most literature recognises that there are three separate levels that transition management must work within; Landscape, Regime and Niche:.

- Landscape (Macro) refers to the overall socio-technical setting that encompasses both the intangible aspects of social values, political beliefs and world views and the tangible facets of the built environment including institutions and the functions of the marketplace such as prices, costs, trade patterns and incomes.

These processes occur within the wider political, cultural and economic background termed the socio-technical landscape. The landscape is an external backdrop to the interplay of actors at the regime and niche level. Changes can occur in the landscape but much more slowly than regime level. One such change is the increase in environmental awareness. This socio-cultural process is leading to pressure on numerous regimes (aviation, agriculture etc.) whilst providing openings for new technologies to establish themselves.

- Regime (Meso) refers to the dominant practices, rules and technologies that provide stability and reinforcement to the prevailing socio-technical systems.

Technological regimes are defined as a set of rules embedded in an engineering community's institutions and infrastructure which shape technological innovations. Geels expanded the focus from engineers to include a wider of range of social groups such as policy makers, financiers and suppliers. This web of inter-linking actors, following a set of rules was termed 'socio-technical regime', in effect, the established practices of a given system. Drawing on evolutionary economics; socio-technical regimes act as a selection and retention mechanism, filtering out the unsuccessful while incorporating more worthy innovations into the existing regime. The regime sits at the meso-level, sandwiched between the micro-level of the niche and the macro-level of the landscape. Change occurs at the regime level incrementally and is geared to achieving optimization. Radical change is potentially threatening to the vested interests of the established regime. The inertia of key industries is seen as an explanation of the difficulties in achieving transitions to sustainability.

- Niche (Micro) is the level or 'area' at which the space is provided for radical innovation and experimentation. This level is less subject to market and regulation influences and can facilitate the interactions between actors that support product innovation.

Radical innovations occur in niches, which act as safe environments in which breakthrough developments can grow, sheltered from the selection process that occurs at regime level. A regime may host a range of niches which generate innovations to challenge the status-quo. The military is seen as a primary niche for major technologies of the last century, supporting the development of radio, aircraft, computers and the internet. The framework of support provided can be financial (most early ventures being commercially unviable); establishing learning processes and facilitating the social networks that lead to growth.

Multi-level Perspective Geels presents the interplay between regime, niche and landscape concepts as a multi-level perspective depicting technological transitions. The model is heuristic rather than ontological, and is an aid to better understand the process.

Figure 1: A Dynamic multi-level perspective on Technological transition at: https://www.researchgate.net/profile/Peter_Van_Waart2/publication/283256188/figure/fig1/AS:300427296952329@1448638857873/A-dynamic-multilevel-perspective-on-technological-transitions-Geels-2011_W640.jpg Geels and Schot: 2007

Ongoing processes at the regime and landscape level present 'windows of opportunity' for new technologies to exploit and become established. These breakthroughs tend to occur gradually through niche-accumulation. As innovations are used in multiple applications they build until achieving a critical mass. The model proposed by Geels shows how the success of a new technology requires developments across all levels to support the processes occurring within the niche (figure 1). Such an alignment is the basis of a regime shift.

=== Actors ===
Each level has its own set of actors that interact in different ways, broadly they can be defined into the following categories:

- Government which creates top-down pressure from regulation, and the use of market incentives, while also encouraging the 'collective learning process' by supporting innovation financially and providing access to information provided by advisory boards
- Market-based actors, who interact both vertically through the supply chain and horizontally with other industry leaders to share best practice and create innovative ideas.
- Civil society which is both the user of the end product provided by the market but also non-governmental organisations which can also provide pressure for change and space for innovation

=== Power and relationships ===
Power within the transition process is distributed rather than being top-down in nature; every actor plays a part in shaping the transition. This distributed power enables the process of mutual adaptation towards collective goals and the emergence of self-organised socio-technical 'trajectories'. However, power is not necessarily evenly distributed; relationships and the power of actors within any system are always mixed which gives rise to different forms of interaction and transition. Transition management seeks to exploit this opportunity by involving a wide selection of participants within the process. There are also a number of other important reasons for widening the participation of actors within governance. Firstly, most actors will have different preferences, a small group of actors, even if representative, will fail to identify one vision that will be accepted by everybody. By engaging all actors a plurality of visions that share common factors can be established and provide the basis for the next step. Furthermore, the use of widened participation is likely to attract stronger support and therefore less resistance to the transition. In order to fully transform the landscape level, the underpinning socio-political values and beliefs will also need to be radically rewritten, without the full involvement of society, this may be susceptible to failure. Finally it has also been considered that the heterogeneity of society allows for collective learning which spurs the development of innovations through exploration at the niche level.

== A multi-level framework ==
Kemp et al. put forward a framework for identifying the different type of activities of which transition management attempts to align. These activities are broadly divided into, strategic, tactical and operational and each activity has its own actors, agendas and strategies which co-evolve.

Strategic activities encompass the process of vision development; the collective action of goal and norm setting through discussion and the formulation of long-term goals. Strategic activities will lead to changes in the 'culture' of the societal system at the landscape level. The focus of this activity is long-term in scale (30 years/generations) and directed towards transition at the landscape level and the system as a whole.

Tactical activities relate to the interaction between actors that steers development of both institutions in the landscape level and socio-technical structures (practices, regulations, technology) at the regime level. Tactical activities focus on interpreting the visions created by strategic activities into the regime level and into the various networks, organisations and institutions involved. Tactical activities will also seek to identify the barriers that may be encountered (such as regulation, economic conditions) when interpreting these visions into the regime level. At this stage, actors that have the ability to make changes are recruited to translate the transition vision into their own agendas.

Finally the operational activities constitute the process of learning by doing through experimentation and implementation at the niche level. It has a much short time span of 0–5 years and is focused on the radical innovation that will transform "societal, technological, institutional, and behavioural practices" that will in turn filter up and transform structures, culture and routines in the regime and landscape levels (Ibid).

A further activity can be considered which establishes the process of assessment and evaluation of societal change. One can observe that reflexive activities can be both embedded within policy and regulation but also as a function of society and the evaluation of policies through the media and internet (ibid).

== Practice ==
There are number of key aspects that differentiate transition management from other forms of governance, these differences are most apparent due to the model's prescriptive nature. With the concept still being quite fresh and only a handful of case studies to draw from the methodology is still under debate. However, most literature (See References - Loorbach 2007, Kemp, Meadowcroft 2009, Kemp and Loorbach 2003, Foxon et al. 2009) constitutes the following methodology:

A problem becomes apparent to actors throughout the levels and domains; the first step involves defining the key parameters of the problem then characterising the existing regime and landscape pressures. Differences in interpretation, perceived pressures, opinions and preference ensues the construction of a plurality of visions and solutions for consideration. A 'basket of objectives' is created which express the shared visions and goals of the actors. The visions outlined are long term in nature most commonly spanning at least one generation if not more and are used to inform short-term objectives. These visions can be expressed in a number of ways; more common forms include the use of pathways, scenarios and blueprints. As an example, if the problem of the unsustainable nature of our oil-dependent nation is presented, visions that may be put forward that constitute a carbon-neutral future include; the hydrogen economy, the all-electric society and the transition to global energy infrastructure to facilitate the maximisation of renewable energy. Although each vision will require different socio-technical changes they will all seek to broadly ensure the same goals are met, for example a low or no carbon economy and a secure and reliable supply.

Once the pathways have been created short-term 'interim' objectives can be formed through Backcasting (as illustrated by the purple lines in the diagram) and actors within the niche level have the opportunity to form innovative solutions to the problem that may contribute to one of more of the pathways. Transition management will seek to identify those niches that will likely destabilise the regime level and contribute the most to its transformation. Once identified these niche opportunities can be supported by regime changes such as new policy implementation that provide new funding opportunities. In addition to deliberative steering of such choices, pressure can also filter down from the landscape level in the form of market forces which may also steer transition. Experiments within the niche level form a series of 'development rounds' which provide information to decision makers regarding the viability of different options. The information provided by the development rounds is evaluated and if the options are considered to be viable the solution is rolled out primarily on a small scale. Evaluative information can also be used to inform the overall vision created (as illustrated in red in the diagram). Eventually the development of options snowball down a particular pathway and a full system transition takes place. Not all development and transition time-scales are consistent within and between the different levels, actors and domains; some change much more quickly than others. In particular, the landscape level is much slower to change than the regime or niche levels; this has led to the concept being labelled as chaotic and non-linear in nature.

== In the United Kingdom ==
Although being less apparent than the Dutch energy transformation, it appears that there is an increasing pressure for theorists to establish frameworks to guide a similar transition within the UK. The UK energy sector is an example of a socio-technical subsystem that exhibits strong lock-in, socially, politically and technically. The technical domain exhibits a strongly centralised infrastructure facilitated by a distribution network, socially speaking the UK energy system is heavily relied upon to provide welfare and enable economic activity. A number of landscape and regime pressures have emerged which impact on the system, primarily related to security of supply and the issue of climate change. The system has also come under pressure from the landscape level in the form of volatile market prices and the impact of the credit crunch. Meanwhile, development at the niche level has continued to build significant levels of alternative technologies and system possibilities through innovation such as offshore wind, wave and tidal power.

At the regime level, institutions such as the European Investment Bank are beginning to provide funding to facilitate the resources required to advance such niche technology. Furthermore, policies such as that of the Renewables Obligation channels funding from the energy industry to support the niche space and development. As per the method, a number of visions are currently being explored, including smart infrastructure, renewable energy alternatives and the viability of hydrogen. The UK Government uses the Renewable Obligation to 'steer' innovators towards particular solutions. More Renewable Obligation Certificates are awarded to those technologies that are pre-demonstration such as tidal and wave power, while developed technologies such as onshore wind receive less.

However, although there are a number of indicators that suggest the transition management model of governance could emerge within the sector, (including in-depth literature outlining the methodology and possible pathways) the UK Government's current pathway (embodied in the UK Low Carbon Transition Plan) does not appear to embody the radical transformation required by transition management. Instead of seeking radical socio-technical transformation, the plan seeks to incrementally improve the system by seeking behavioural changes such as energy efficiency and technical changes by enhancing the contribution of renewables. Without radical infrastructure change the UK risks locking-out a number of promising possible alternatives and may significantly increase the cost of transformation in the future when the need for fundamental systems change becomes more apparent as the current system becomes less able to meet demand.

== See also ==
- Transition design
- Transition town
