= Trevor Pinch =

British sociologist (1952–2021)

Trevor J. Pinch
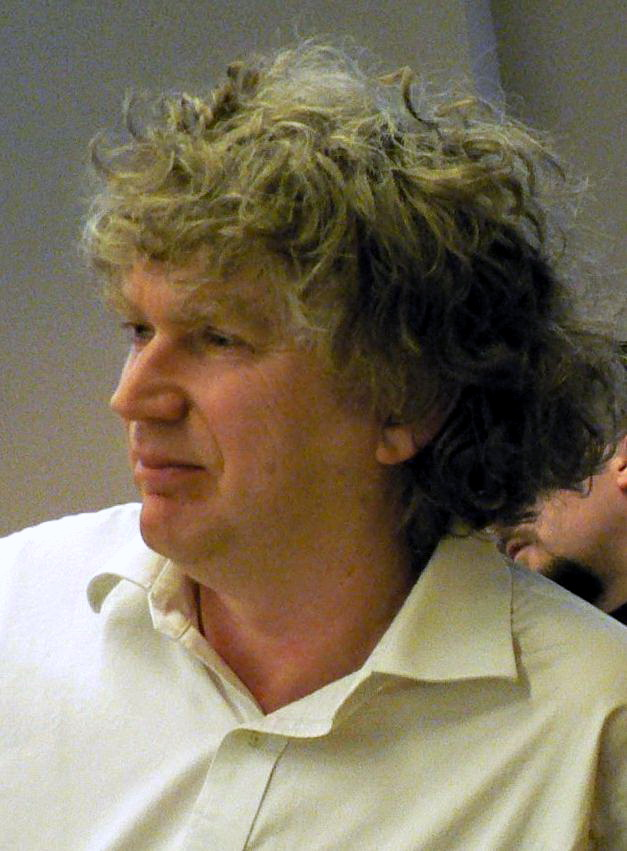
- Pinch in 2007
- Born: 1 January 1952; Lisnaskea, Northern Ireland
- Died: 16 December 2021 (aged 69)

Academic background
- Education: University of Bath

Academic work
- Notable works: Confronting Nature
- Notable ideas: Social Construction of Technology (SCOT)

Trevor J. Pinch (1 January 1952 – 16 December 2021) was a British sociologist, part-time musician and chair of the science and technology studies department at Cornell University. In 2018, he won the J.D. Bernal Prize from the Society for Social Studies of Science for "distinguished contributions to Science and Technology Studies over the course of [a] career."

== Personal life ==
Pinch was born in Lisnaskea, Northern Ireland on the New Year's Day of 1952.

He lived in Cornell's Forest Home neighborhood and started the band Electric Golem.

Pinch died from cancer, four years after his initial diagnosis, on 16 December 2021, 16 days before his 70th birthday.

== Career ==
Pinch held a degree in physics from Imperial College London and a PhD in sociology from the University of Bath.

He taught sociology at the University of York before moving to the United States. Together with Wiebe Bijker, Pinch started the movement known as Social Construction of Technology (SCOT) within the sociology of science.

== Works ==
Pinch was a significant contributor to the study of sound culture, and his books include a major study of Robert Moog. His book Confronting Nature is widely considered the definitive sociological account of the history of the solar neutrino problem, and was mentioned by Raymond Davis in his 2002 Nobel Prize autobiography.

=== Books ===
- Pinch, Trevor; Bijker, Wiebe E.; Hughes, Thomas P. (1987). The social construction of technological systems: new directions in the sociology and history of technology. Cambridge, Massachusetts: MIT Press. ISBN 9780262022620.
- Pinch, Trevor; Mulkay, Michael; Ashmore, Malcolm (1989). Health and efficiency: a sociology of health economics. Milton Keynes, England and Philadelphia: Open University Press. ISBN 9780335099122.
- Pinch, Trevor; Gooding, David; Schaffer, Simon (1989). The uses of experiment: studies in the natural sciences. Cambridge, England and New York City: Cambridge University Press. ISBN 9780521337687.
- Pinch, Trevor; Collins, Harry M. (1998) [1993]. The golem: what you should know about science (2nd ed.). Cambridge, England and New York City: Cambridge University Press. ISBN 9781107604650.
- Pinch, Trevor; Collins, Harry M. (2014) [1998]. The golem at large: what you should know about technology (6th ed.). Cambridge, England: Cambridge University Press. ISBN 9781107688285.
- Pinch, Trevor; Trocco, Frank (2002). Analog days the invention and impact of the Moog synthesizer. Cambridge, Massachusetts: Harvard University Press. ISBN 9780674016170.
- Pinch, Trevor; Oudshoorn, Nellie (2005). How users matter the co-construction of users and technology. Cambridge, Massachusetts: MIT Press. ISBN 9780262651097.
- Pinch, Trevor; Collins, Harry M. (2005). Dr. Golem how to think about medicine. Chicago: University of Chicago Press. ISBN 9780226113692.
- Pinch, Trevor; Bijsterveld, Karin (2012). The Oxford Handbook of Sound Studies. Oxford University Press. ISBN 9780195388947.
- Pinch, Trevor; Swedberg, Richard (2008). Living in a Material World: Economic Sociology Meets Science and Technology Studies. MIT Press. ISBN 978-0-262-66207-9

=== Chapters in books ===
- Pinch, Trevor; Kline, Ronald (1999) [1985], "The social construction of technology", in MacKenzie, Donald; Wajcman, Judy (eds.), The social shaping of technology (2nd ed.), Buckingham England Philadelphia: Open University Press, pp. 113–115, ISBN 9780335199136.
- Pinch, Trevor; Bijker, Wiebe E. (1987), "The social construction of facts and artefacts: or how the sociology of science and the sociology of technology might benefit each other", in Pinch, Trevor; Bijker, Wiebe E.; Hughes, Thomas P. (eds.), The social construction of technological systems: new directions in the sociology and history of technology, Cambridge, Massachusetts: MIT Press, pp. 17–50, ISBN 9780262022620.
- Pinch, Trevor; Ashmore, Malcolm; Mulkay, Michael (1992), "Technology, testing, text: clinical budgeting in the UK National Health Service", in Bijker, Wiebe E.; Law, John (eds.), Shaping technology/building society: studies in sociotechnical change, Cambridge, Massachusetts: MIT Press, pp. 265–289, ISBN 9780262521949.
- Pinch, Trevor (1996), "The social construction of technology: a review", in Fox, Robert (ed.), Technological change: methods and themes in the history of technology, Amsterdam, Holland: Harwood Academic Publishers, pp. 17–35, ISBN 9789057023378.
- Pinch, Trevor (2001), "Why do you go to a piano store to buy a synthesizer: path dependence and the social construction of technology", in Garud, Raghu; Karnøe, Peter (eds.), Path dependence and creation, Mahwah, New Jersey: Lawrence Erlbaum Associates, pp. 381–399, ISBN 9780805832723.

=== Journal articles ===
- Pinch, Trevor; Bijker, Wiebe E. (August 1984). "The social construction of facts and artefacts: or how the sociology of science and the sociology of technology might benefit each other" (PDF). Social Studies of Science. 14 (3): 388–441. doi:10.1177/030631284014003004. S2CID 19157599.

Russell, Stewart (May 1986). "The social construction of artefacts: a response to Pinch and Bijker". Social Studies of Science. 16 (2): 331–346. doi:10.1177/0306312786016002008. S2CID 144072557.

- Pinch, Trevor; Bijker, Wiebe E. (May 1986). "Science, relativism and the new sociology of technology: reply to Russell" (PDF). Social Studies of Science. 16 (2): 347–360. doi:10.1177/0306312786016002009. S2CID 146498773.
- Pinch, Trevor (November 1990). "Deconstructing Roth and Barrett". Social Studies of Science. 20 (4): 658–663. doi:10.1177/030631290020004004. S2CID 144299717.
- Pinch, Trevor; Kline, Ronald (October 1996). "Users as agents of technological change: the social construction of the automobile in the rural United States". Technology and Culture. 37 (4): 763–795. doi:10.2307/3107097. JSTOR 3107097. S2CID 147484868.
- Pinch, Trevor (January 2010). "On making infrastructure visible: putting the non-humans to rights". Cambridge Journal of Economics. 34 (1): 77–89. doi:10.1093/cje/bep044.
