= Emma Kowal =

Australian cultural and medical anthropologist

Emma Kowal FASSA FAHMS
- Occupations: anthropologist, physician, public health researcher, professor
- Awards: Paul Bourke Award for Early Career Research

Academic background
- Education: University of Melbourne (BA, MBBS, PhD)

Academic work
- Discipline: medical anthropology, public health
- Institutions: Deakin University

Emma Kowal FASSA is an Australian cultural and medical anthropologist, physician and scholar of science and technology studies. She is most well known for her books Trapped in the Gap: Doing Good in Indigenous Australia, and the co-edited volumes of Force, Movement, Intensity: The Newtonian Imagination in the Humanities and Social Sciences (with Ghassan Hage), Cryopolitics: Frozen Life in a Melting World (with Joanna Radin).

== Early life and education ==
She received her Bachelor of Medicine and Bachelor of Surgery and a Bachelor of Arts in history and philosophy of science from University of Melbourne in 2000 and worked for a few years as a physician and a public health professional in the Northern Territory of Australia. She returned to the University of Melbourne to receive her PhD in public health anthropology in 2007. She is currently a professor in anthropology at Deakin University and Convenor of the Deakin Science and Society Network.

== Career ==
In 2014, she received the Paul Bourke Award for Early Career Research from the Academy of the Social Sciences in Australia. She was the deputy director for the National Centre for Indigenous Genomics at Australian National University between 2013 and 2017. In 2019, she was elected to the Fellowship of the Academy of the Social Sciences in Australia. Since 2021, Emma Kowal is president of the Society for Social Studies of Science. She was elected a Fellow of the Australian Academy of Health and Medical Sciences in 2022. Kowal is a member of the Australian Health Ethics Committee, and she is on the Australian Research Council's College of Experts.

== Publications ==
Emma Kowal has contributed to a large number of scholarly articles.
