= Centre de Sociologie de l'Innovation =

Research facility in Paris, France

Coordinates: 48.846°N 2.339°E

The Centre de Sociologie de l'Innovation (CSI; "Center for the Sociology of Innovation") is a research center at the Mines Paris – PSL, France, and a research unit affiliated to the French National Centre for Scientific Research.

The CSI was created in 1967 and is known for its members' contributions to the field of science and technology studies and to actor–network theory. Prominent past and current members include academics such as Bruno Latour and Michel Callon.

Directors

- 2003-2013 Madeleine Akrich
