= Obligatory passage point =

Sociology concept

The concept of an obligatory passage point (OPP) was developed by sociologist Michel Callon in a seminal contribution to actor–network theory: Callon, Michel (1986), "Elements of a sociology of translation: Domestication of the Scallops and the Fishermen of St Brieuc Bay". In John Law (Ed.), Power, Action and Belief: A New Sociology of Knowledge? London, Routledge: 196–233.

Obligatory passage points are a feature of actor-networks, usually associated with the initial (problematization) phase of a translation process. An OPP can be thought of as the narrow end of a funnel, that forces the actors to converge on a certain topic, purpose or question. The OPP thereby becomes a necessary element for the formation of a network and an action program. The OPP thereby mediates all interactions between actors in a network and defines the action program. Obligatory passage points allow for local networks to set up negotiation spaces that allow them a degree of autonomy from the global network of involved actors.

If a project is unable to impose itself as a strong OPP between the global and local networks, it has no control over global resources such as financial and political support, which can be misused or withdrawn. Additionally, a weak OPP is unable to take credit for the successes achieved within the local network, as outside actors are able to bypass its control and influence the local network directly.

An action program can comprise a number of different OPPs. An OPP can also be redefined as the problematization phase is revisited.

In Callon and Law's '"Engineering and Sociology in a Military Aircraft Project" the project management of a project to design a new strategic jet fighter for the British Military became an obligatory passage point between representatives of government and aerospace engineers.

In recent years, the notion of the obligatory passage point has taken hold in information systems security and information privacy disciplines and journals. Backhouse et al. (2006) illustrated how practices and policies are standardized and institutionalized through OPP.
