= Mapping controversies =

Academic discipline

Mapping controversies (MC) is an academic course taught in science studies, stemming from the writings of the French sociologist and philosopher Bruno Latour. MC focuses exclusively on the controversies surrounding scientific knowledge rather than the established scientific facts or outcomes. Thus, it helps sociologists, anthropologists and other social scientists get insights not into scientific knowledge per se, but rather into the process of gaining knowledge. Thus, MC sheds light on those intermediate stages corresponding to the actual research process and pinpoints the connections between scientific work and other types of activities.

== History ==
The term mapping controversies was first suggested in relation to analysis of scientific and technological controversies, and then lately re-affirmed as a widely applicable methodological approach going beyond the boundaries of science studies. It is usually used for the methodology that identifies and tracks down the polemics or debate surrounding a scientific fact, and utilises various visualisation tools to present the problem in its complexity.

From January 2008 until December 2009, Latour coordinated the project "Mapping Controversies on Science for Politics (MACOSPOL)". The showcase website is mappingcontroversies.net.

In 2008 and 2009 several universities in Europe and the USA started teaching mapping controversies courses for students in political sciences, engineering, and architecture.

An earlier attempt to stage controversies in museum settings took place at the Gallery of Research in Vienna in 2005.
