= Non-human =

Entity that is not considered human

Non-human (also spelled nonhuman) is any entity displaying some human characteristics, but not enough to be considered human. The term has been used in a variety of contexts and may refer to objects that have been developed with human intelligence, such as robots or vehicles.

== Organisms ==
=== Animal rights and personhood ===
In the animal rights movement, it is common to distinguish between "human animals" and "non-human animals". Participants in the animal rights movement generally recognize that non-human animals have some similar characteristics to those of human persons. For example, various non-human animals have been shown to register pain, compassion, memory, and some cognitive function. Some animal rights activists argue that the similarities between human and non-human animals justify giving non-human animals rights that human society has afforded to humans, such as the right to self-preservation, and some even wish for all non-human animals or at least those that bear a fully thinking and conscious mind, such as vertebrates and some invertebrates such as cephalopods, to be given a full right of personhood.

=== The non-human in philosophy ===
Contemporary philosophers have drawn on the work of Henri Bergson, Gilles Deleuze, Félix Guattari, and Claude Lévi-Strauss (among others) to suggest that the non-human poses epistemological and ontological problems for humanist and post-humanist ethics, and have linked the study of non-humans to materialist and ethological approaches to the study of society and culture.

== Software and robots ==
The term non-human has been used to describe computer programs and robot-like devices that display some human-like characteristics. In both science fiction and in the real world, computer programs and robots have been built to perform tasks that require human-computer interactions in a manner that suggests sentience and compassion. There is increasing interest in the use of robots in nursing homes and to provide elder care. Computer programs have been used for years in schools to provide one-on-one education with children. The Tamagotchi toy required children to provide care, attention, and nourishment to keep it "alive".

== See also ==
- AI anthropomorphism
- Animal
- Animal rights by country or territory
- Artificial intelligence
- Dehumanization
- Person
