= Michel Callon =

French sociologist and philosopher of science (1945–2025)

- Born: 1945
- Died: 28 July 2025 (aged 79–80)
- Awards: CNRS Silver Medal, John Desmond Bernal Prize

Academic background
- Education: École des Mines

Academic work
- Main interests: Sociology, Science and Technology Studies
- Notable ideas: Actor–network theory

Michel Callon (1945 – 28 July 2025) was a French sociologist who was a professor of sociology at the École des mines de Paris and member of the Centre de sociologie de l'innovation. He was an author in the field of Science and Technology Studies and one of the leading proponents of actor–network theory (ANT) with Madeleine Akrich, John Law and Bruno Latour. Callon died on 28 July 2025.

== Works ==
Callon's earlier works on sociology of science and on translation contributed to the study of how scientists act to problematize an issue, interest other actors and recruit them as to mobilize a constituency around an issue. His article Some elements of a sociology of translation: domestication of the scallops and the fishermen of St Brieuc Bay is one of the most cited in the literature of Science and Technology Studies.

From the late 1990s, Callon led efforts to apply ANT approaches to study economic life, notably economic markets. This body of work interrogates the interrelation between the economy and economics, highlighting the ways in which economics and economics-inspired disciplines such as marketing shape the economy.

== See also ==
- Obligatory passage point

== Bibliography ==
=== Books ===
- Callon, Michel; Law, John; Rip, Arie (1986). Mapping the dynamics of science and technology: sociology of science in the real world. Basingstoke: Macmillan. ISBN 9780333372234.
- Callon, Michel (ed.) (1998). The Laws of the Markets. London: Blackwell Publishers.
- Callon, Michel (2005). "Why virtualism paves the way to political impotence", Economic Sociology - the European electronic newsletter. Read as PDF
- Callon, M., Lascoumes, P., & Barthe, Y. (2009). Acting in an uncertain world: an essay on technical democracy. The MIT Press.
- Callon, M. (2021). Markets in the Making: Rethinking Competition, Goods, and Innovation. United States: Zone Books.

=== Chapters in books ===
- Callon, Michel (1980). "Struggles and Negotiations to Define What is Problematic and What is Not: The Socio-logic of Translation." pp. 197–221 in The Social Process of Scientific Investigation, edited by Karin D. Knorr. Dordrecht: Reidel Publishing.
- Callon, Michel (1986). "Some Elements of a Sociology of Translation: Domestication of the Scallops and the Fishermen of St Brieuc Bay." pp. 196–233 in Power, Action and Belief: A New Sociology of Knowledge, edited by John Law. London: Routledge & Kegan Paul.
- Callon, Michel (1987), "Society in the making: the study of technology as a tool for sociological analysis", in Bijker, Wiebe E.; Hughes, Thomas P.; Pinch, Trevor (eds.), The social construction of technological systems: new directions in the sociology and history of technology, Cambridge, Massachusetts: MIT Press, pp. 83–103, ISBN 9780262022620.
- Callon, Michel (1991), "Techno-economic networks and irreversibility", in Law, John (ed.), A sociology of monsters: essays on power, technology and domination, London: Routledge, pp. 132–165, ISBN 9780262022620.
- Callon, Michel; Latour, Bruno (1992), "Don't throw the baby out with the Bath School! A reply to Collins and Yearley", in Pickering, Andrew (ed.), Science as practice and culture, Chicago, Illinois: University of Chicago Press, pp. 343–368, ISBN 9780226668017.
