= Bruno Latour =

French philosopher, anthropologist and sociologist (1947–2022)

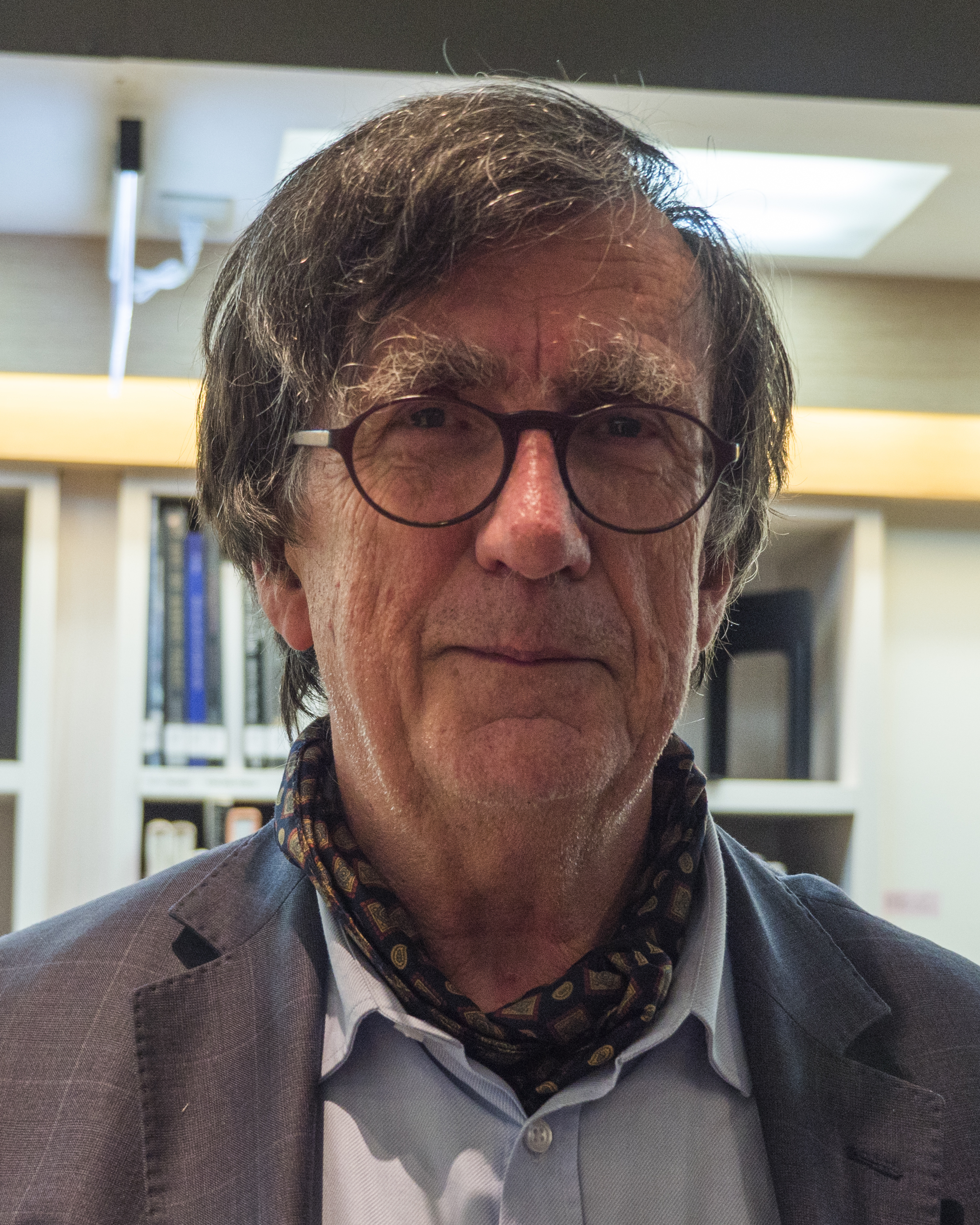
- Latour in 2017
- Born: 22 June 1947; Beaune, Côte-d'Or, France
- Died: 9 October 2022 (aged 75); Paris, France
- Awards: Holberg Prize (2013); Kyoto Prize (2021)

Education
- Education: University of Tours (PhD, 1975)
- Doctoral advisor: Claude Bruaire

Philosophical work
- Era: Contemporary philosophy
- Region: Western philosophy
- School: Continental philosophy Social constructionism Actor–network theory
- Institutions: ORSTOM; Centre de Sociologie de l'Innovation; Mines ParisTech; Sciences Po; London School of Economics; University of Amsterdam
- Notable works: Laboratory Life (1979); Science in Action (1987); We Have Never Been Modern (1991); Politics of Nature (1999)
- Notable ideas: Actor–network theory, actant, blackboxing, graphism thesis, mapping controversies, nonmodernism
- Website: http://www.bruno-latour.fr

Bruno Latour (/ləˈtʊər/; French: [latuʁ]; 22 June 1947 – 9 October 2022) was a French philosopher, anthropologist and sociologist. He was especially known for his work in the field of science and technology studies (STS). After teaching at the Centre de Sociologie de l'Innovation of the École des Mines de Paris from 1982 to 2006, he became a professor at Sciences Po Paris (2006–2017), where he was the scientific director of the Sciences Po Medialab. He retired from several university activities in 2017. He was also a Centennial Professor at the London School of Economics.

Latour is best known for his books We Have Never Been Modern (1991; English translation, 1993), Laboratory Life (with Steve Woolgar, 1979) and Science in Action (1987). He was best known for withdrawing from the subjective/objective division and redeveloping the approach to work in practice. Latour said in 2017 that he is interested in helping to rebuild trust in science and that some of the authority of science needs to be regained. Along with Michel Callon, Madeleine Akrich, and John Law, Latour is one of the primary developers of actor–network theory (ANT), a constructionist approach influenced by the ethnomethodology of Harold Garfinkel, the generative semiotics of Algirdas Julien Greimas, and the sociology of Émile Durkheim's rival Gabriel Tarde.

== Biography ==
Latour was related to a well-known family of winemakers from Burgundy known as Maison Louis Latour, but was not associated with the similarly named Château Latour estate in Bordeaux.

As a student, Latour originally focused on philosophy. In 1971–1972, he ranked second and then first (reçu second, premier) in the French national competitive exam agrégation/CAPES de philosophie. Latour went on to earn his PhD degree in philosophical theology at the University of Tours in 1975. His thesis title was Exégèse et ontologie: une analyse des textes de resurrection (Exegesis and Ontology: An Analysis of the Texts of Resurrection).

Latour developed an interest in anthropology, and undertook fieldwork in Ivory Coast, on behalf of ORSTOM, which resulted in a brief monograph on decolonisation, race, and industrial relations. In the 1990s, he engaged in a series of dialogues with Michel Serres that were published as Eclaircissements (Conversations on Science, Culture and Time).

After spending more than twenty years (1982–2006) at the Centre de sociologie de l'innovation at the École des Mines in Paris, Latour moved in 2006 to Sciences Po, where he was the first occupant of a chair named for Gabriel Tarde. In recent years, he also served as one of the curators of successful art exhibitions at the Zentrum für Kunst und Medientechnologie in Karlsruhe, Germany, including "Iconoclash" (2002) and "Making Things Public" (2005). In 2005, he also held the Spinoza Chair of Philosophy at the University of Amsterdam.

Latour remained religious until the end of his life, reading the Bible "devotedly."

Latour died from pancreatic cancer on 9 October 2022, at the age of 75. His papers were contributed to the French National Archives and the Municipal Archives of Beaune.

== Awards and honours ==
On 22 May 2008, Latour was awarded an honorary doctorate by the Université de Montréal on the occasion of an organizational communication conference held in honour of the work of James R. Taylor, on whom Latour has had an important influence. He held several other honorary doctorates, as well as France's Légion d'Honneur (2012).

=== Holberg Prize ===
On 13 March 2013, he was announced as the winner of the 2013 Holberg Prize. The prize committee stated that "Bruno Latour has undertaken an ambitious analysis and reinterpretation of modernity, and has challenged fundamental concepts such as the distinction between modern and pre-modern, nature and society, human and non-human." The committee states that "the impact of Latour's work is evident internationally and far beyond studies of the history of science, art history, history, philosophy, anthropology, geography, theology, literature and law."

A 2013 article in Aftenposten by Norwegian philosopher Jon Elster criticised the conferment to Latour, by saying "The question is, does he deserve the prize. ... If the statutes [of the award] had used new knowledge as the main criteria, instead as one of several, then he would be completely unqualified in my opinion."

=== Spinoza and Kyoto Prize ===
The Dutch "International Spinozaprijs Foundation" awarded the "Spinozalens 2020" to Bruno Latour on 24 November 2020. In 2021 he received the Kyoto Prize in the category "Thought and Ethics".

== Main works ==
=== Laboratory Life ===
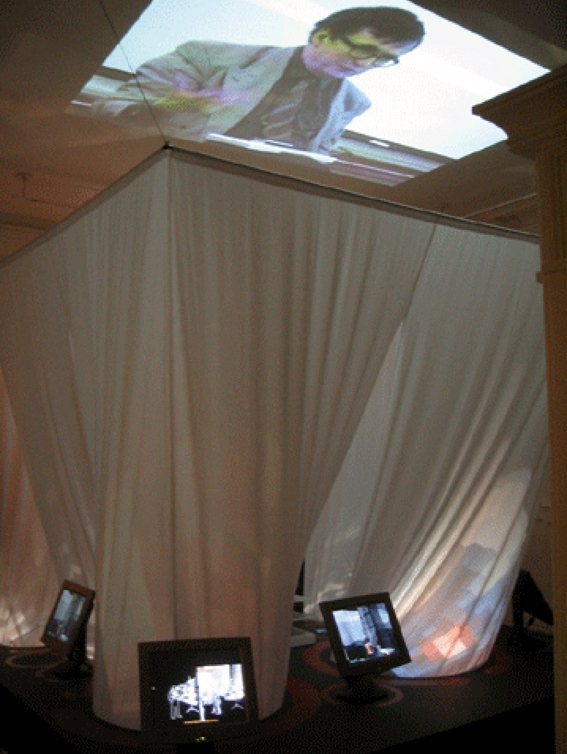
Making Things Public: installation mock-up with Latour's image at Buell Hall, Columbia University, New York, 2004.

After his early career efforts, Latour shifted his research interests to focus on laboratory scientists. Latour rose in importance following the 1979 publication of Laboratory Life: the Social Construction of Scientific Facts with co-author Steve Woolgar. In the book, the authors undertake an ethnographic study of a neuroendocrinology research laboratory at the Salk Institute. This early work argued that naïve descriptions of the scientific method, in which theories stand or fall on the outcome of a single experiment, are inconsistent with actual laboratory practice.

In the laboratory, Latour and Woolgar observed that a typical experiment produces only inconclusive data that is attributed to failure of the apparatus or experimental method, and that a large part of scientific training involves learning how to make the subjective decision of what data to keep and what data to throw out. Latour and Woolgar argued that, for untrained observers, the entire process resembles not an unbiased search for truth and accuracy but a mechanism for ignoring data that contradicts scientific orthodoxy.

Latour and Woolgar produced a highly heterodox and controversial picture of the sciences. Drawing on the work of Gaston Bachelard, they advance the notion that the objects of scientific study are socially constructed within the laboratory—that they cannot be attributed with an existence outside of the instruments that measure them and the minds that interpret them. They view scientific activity as a system of beliefs, oral traditions and culturally specific practices—in short, science is reconstructed not as a procedure or as a set of principles but as a culture. Latour's 1987 book Science in Action: How to Follow Scientists and Engineers through Society is one of the key texts of the sociology of scientific knowledge (SSK) in which he famously wrote his Second Principle as follows: "Scientist and engineers speak in the name of new allies that they have shaped and enrolled; representatives among other representatives, they add these unexpected resources to tip the balance of force in their favor." Some scholars in the SSK tradition reject Latour as a practitioner of SSK.

Some of Latour's positions and findings in this era provoked vehement rebuttals. Gross and Leavitt argue that Latour's position becomes absurd when applied to non-scientific contexts: e.g., if a group of coworkers in a windowless room were debating whether or not it were raining outside and went outdoors to discover raindrops in the air and puddles on the soil, Latour's hypothesis would assert that the rain was socially constructed. Similarly, philosopher John Searle argues that Latour's "extreme social constructivist" position is seriously flawed on several points, and furthermore generates inadvertently "comical results".

=== The Pasteurization of France ===
After a research project examining the sociology of primatologists, Latour followed up the themes in Laboratory Life with Les Microbes: guerre et paix (published in English as The Pasteurization of France in 1988). In it, he reviews the life and career of one of France's most famous scientists Louis Pasteur and his discovery of microbes, in the fashion of a political biography. Latour highlights the social forces at work in and around Pasteur's career and the uneven manner in which his theories were accepted. By providing more explicitly ideological explanations for the acceptance of Pasteur's work more easily in some quarters than in others, he seeks to undermine the notion that the acceptance and rejection of scientific theories is primarily, or even usually, a matter of experiment, evidence or reason.

=== Aramis, or The Love of Technology ===
Aramis, or The Love of Technology focuses on the history of an unsuccessful mass-transit project. Aramis PRT (personal rapid transit), a high-tech automated subway, had been developed in France during the 70s and 80s and was supposed to be implemented as a personal rapid transit system in Paris. It combined the flexibility of an automobile with the efficiency of a subway. Aramis was to be an ideal urban transportation system based on private cars in constant motion and the elimination of unnecessary transfers. This new form of transportation was intended to be as secure and inexpensive as collective transportation. The proposed system had custom-designed motors, sensors, controls, digital electronics, software and a major installation in southern Paris. But in the end, the project died in 1987. Latour argues that the technology failed not because any particular actor killed it, but because the actors failed to sustain it through negotiation and adaptation to a changing social situation. While investigating Aramis's demise, Latour delineates the tenets of actor-network theory. According to Latour's own description of the book, the work aims "at training readers in the booming field of technology studies and at experimenting in the many new literary forms that are necessary to handle mechanisms and automatisms without using the belief that they are mechanical or automatic."

=== We Have Never Been Modern ===
Latour's work Nous n'avons jamais été modernes : Essai d'anthropologie symétrique was first published in French in 1991, and then in English in 1993 as We Have Never Been Modern.

Latour encouraged the reader of this anthropology of science to rethink and re-evaluate our mental landscape. He evaluated the work of scientists and contemplated the contribution of the scientific method to knowledge and work, blurring the distinction across various fields and disciplines.

Latour argued that society has never really been modern and promoted nonmodernism (or amodernism) over postmodernism, modernism, or antimodernism. His stance was that we have never been modern and minor divisions alone separate Westerners now from other collectives. Latour viewed modernism as an era that believed it had annulled the entire past in its wake. He presented the antimodern reaction as defending such entities as spirit, rationality, liberty, society, God, or even the past. Postmoderns, according to Latour, also accepted the modernistic abstractions as if they were real. In contrast, the nonmodern approach reestablished symmetry between science and technology on the one hand and society on the other. Latour also referred to the impossibility of returning to premodernism because it precluded the large-scale experimentation which was a benefit of modernism.

Latour attempted to prove through case studies the fallacy in the old object/subject and Nature/Society compacts of modernity, which can be traced back to Plato. He refused the concept of "out there" versus "in here". He rendered the object/subject distinction as simply unusable and charted a new approach towards knowledge, work, and circulating reference. Latour considered nonmoderns to be playing on a different field, one vastly different to that of post-moderns. He referred to it as much broader and much less polemical, a creation of an unknown territory, which he playfully referred to as the Middle Kingdom.

In 1998, historian of science Margaret C. Jacob argued that Latour's politicised account of the development of modernism in the 17th century is "a fanciful escape from modern Western history".

=== Pandora's Hope ===
Pandora's Hope (1999) marks a return to the themes Latour explored in Science in Action and We Have Never Been Modern. It uses independent but thematically linked essays and case studies to question the authority and reliability of scientific knowledge. Latour uses a narrative, anecdotal approach in a number of the essays, describing his work with pedologists in the Amazon rainforest, the development of the pasteurisation process, and the research of French atomic scientists at the outbreak of the Second World War. Latour states that this specific, anecdotal approach to science studies is essential to gaining a full understanding of the discipline: "The only way to understand the reality of science studies is to follow what science studies do best, that is, paying close attention to the details of scientific practice" (p. 24). Some authors have criticised Latour's methodology, including Katherine Pandora, a history of science professor at the University of Oklahoma. In her review of Pandora's Hope, Katherine Pandora states:

[Latour's] writing can be stimulating, fresh and at times genuinely moving, but it can also display a distractingly mannered style in which a rococo zeal for compounding metaphors, examples, definitions and abstractions can frustrate even readers who approach his work with the best of intentions (notwithstanding the inclusion of a nine-page glossary of terms and liberal use of diagrams in an attempt to achieve the utmost clarity).

In addition to his epistemological concerns, Latour also explores the political dimension of science studies in Pandora's Hope. Two of the chapters draw on Plato's Gorgias as a means of investigating and highlighting the distinction between content and context. As Katherine Pandora states in her review:

It is hard not to be caught up in the author's obvious delight in deploying a classic work from antiquity to bring current concerns into sharper focus, following along as he manages to leave the reader with the impression that the protagonists Socrates and Callicles are not only in dialogue with each other but with Latour as well.

Although Latour frames his discussion with a classical model, his examples of fraught political issues are all current and of continuing relevance: global warming, the spread of mad cow disease, and the carcinogenic effects of smoking are all mentioned at various points in Pandora's Hope. In Felix Stalder's article "Beyond constructivism: towards a realistic realism", he summarizes Latour's position on the political dimension of science studies as follows: "These scientific debates have been artificially kept open in order to render impossible any political action against these problems and those who profit from them".

=== "Why Has Critique Run Out of Steam?" ===
In a 2004 article, Latour questioned the fundamental premises on which he had based most of his career, asking, "Was I wrong to participate in the invention of this field known as science studies?" He undertakes a trenchant critique of his own field of study and, more generally, of social criticism in contemporary academia. He suggests that critique, as currently practised, is bordering on irrelevancy. To maintain any vitality, Latour argues that social critiques require a drastic reappraisal: "our critical equipment deserves as much critical scrutiny as the Pentagon budget." (p. 231) To regain focus and credibility, Latour argues that social critiques must embrace empiricism, to insist on the "cultivation of a stubbornly realist attitude – to speak like William James". (p. 233)

Latour suggests that about 90 per cent of contemporary social criticism displays one of two approaches, which he terms "the fact position and the fairy position." (p. 237) The fairy position is anti-fetishist, arguing that "objects of belief" (e.g., religion, arts) are merely concepts created by the projected wishes and desires of the "naive believer"; the "fact position" argues that individuals are dominated, often covertly and without their awareness, by external forces (e.g., economics, gender). (p. 238) "Do you see now why it feels so good to be a critical mind?" asks Latour: no matter which position you take, "You're always right!" (p. 238–239) Social critics tend to use anti-fetishism against ideas they personally reject; to use "an unrepentant positivist" approach for fields of study they consider valuable; all the while thinking as "a perfectly healthy sturdy realist for what you really cherish." (p. 241) These inconsistencies and double standards go largely unrecognised in social critique because "there is never any crossover between the two lists of objects in the fact position and the fairy position." (p. 241)

The practical result of these approaches being taught to millions of students in elite universities for several decades is a widespread and influential "critical barbarity" that has—like a malign virus created by a "mad scientist"—thus far proven impossible to control. Most troubling, Latour notes that critical ideas have been appropriated by those he describes as conspiracy theorists, including global warming deniers and the 9/11 Truth movement: "Maybe I am taking conspiracy theories too seriously, but I am worried to detect, in those mad mixtures of knee-jerk disbelief, punctilious demands for proofs, and free use of powerful explanation from the social neverland, many of the weapons of social critique." (p. 230)

The conclusion of the article is to argue for a positive framing of critique, to help understand how matters of concern can be supported rather than undermined: "The critic is not the one who lifts the rugs from under the feet of the naïve believers, but the one who offers the participants arenas in which to gather. The critic is not the one who alternates haphazardly between antifetishism and positivism like the drunk iconoclast drawn by Goya, but the one for whom, if something is constructed, then it means it is fragile and thus in great need of care and caution."

Latour's article has been highly influential within the field of postcritique, an intellectual movement within literary criticism and cultural studies that seeks to find new forms of reading and interpretation that go beyond the methods of critique, critical theory, and ideological criticism. The literary critic Rita Felski has named Latour as an important precursor to the project of postcritique.

=== Reassembling the Social ===
In Reassembling the Social (2005), Latour continues a reappraisal of his work, developing what he calls a "practical metaphysics", which calls "real" anything that an actor (one whom we are studying) claims as a source of motivation for action. So if someone says, "I was inspired by God to be charitable to my neighbours" we are obliged to recognise the "ontological weight" of their claim, rather than attempting to replace their belief in God's presence with "social stuff", like class, gender, imperialism, etc. Latour's nuanced metaphysics demands the existence of a plurality of worlds, and the willingness of the researcher to chart ever more. He argues that researchers must give up the hope of fitting their actors into a structure or framework, but Latour believes the benefits of this sacrifice far outweigh the downsides: "Their complex metaphysics would at least be respected, their recalcitrance recognised, their objections deployed, their multiplicity accepted."

For Latour, to talk about metaphysics or ontology—what really is—means paying close empirical attention to the various, contradictory institutions and ideas that bring people together and inspire them to act. Here is Latour's description of metaphysics:

If we call metaphysics the discipline inspired by the philosophical tradition that purports to define the basic structure of the world, then empirical metaphysics is what the controversies over agencies lead to, since they ceaselessly populate the world with new drives and, as ceaselessly, contest the existence of others. The question then becomes how to explore the actors' own metaphysics.

A more traditional metaphysicist might object, arguing that this means there are multiple, contradictory realities, since there are "controversies over agencies" – since there is a plurality of contradictory ideas that people claim as a basis for action (God, nature, the state, sexual drives, personal ambition, and so on). This objection manifests the most important difference between traditional philosophical metaphysics and Latour's nuance: for Latour, there is no "basic structure of reality" or a single, self-consistent world. An unknowably large multiplicity of realities, or "worlds" in his terms, exists–one for each actor's sources of agency, inspirations for action. In this, Latour is remarkably close to B.F. Skinner's position in Beyond Freedom and Dignity and the philosophy of radical behaviourism. Actors bring "the real" (metaphysics) into being. The task of the researcher is not to find one "basic structure" that explains agency, but to recognise "the metaphysical innovations proposed by ordinary actors". Mapping those metaphysical innovations involves a strong dedication to relativism, Latour argues. The relativist researcher "learns the actors' language," records what they say about what they do, and does not appeal to a higher "structure" to "explain" the actor's motivations. The relativist "takes seriously what [actors] are obstinately saying" and "follows the direction indicated by their fingers when they designate what 'makes them act'". The relativist recognises the plurality of metaphysics that actors bring into being, and attempts to map them rather than reducing them to a single structure or explanation.

== In the science wars ==
In Fashionable Nonsense, the physicists Alan Sokal and Jean Bricmont quote Latour's claim in Science in Action that "they [scientists and engineers] do not use Nature as the external referee," which Sokal and Bricmont say is false. Scientists "are not relativist..they do 'use Nature as the external referee': that is, they seek to know what is really happening in Nature, and they design experiments for that purpose." Sokal and Bricmont also critically cite an article written by Latour in La Recherche in 1998 that referred to research showing that the pharaoh Ramses II probably died of tuberculosis in which Latour asks "How could he pass away due to a bacillus discovered by Koch in 1882?", claims that "Before Koch, the bacillus has no real existence" and writes that a pharaoh dying of tuberculosis is as much of an anachronism as it would be to claim that the pharaoh died of machine-gun fire.

Latour noted that he had been asked, "Do you believe in reality?", which caused a "quick and laughing answer". Reality, for Latour, is neither something we have to believe in nor do we have lost access to it in the first place.

'Do you believe in reality?' To ask such a question one has to become so distant from reality that the fear of losing it entirely becomes plausible—and this fear itself has an intellectual history [...] Only a mind put in the strangest position, looking at a world from inside out and linked to the outside by nothing but the tenuous connection of the gaze, will throb in the constant fear of losing reality; only such a bodiless observer will desperately look for some absolute life-supporting survival kit.

According to Latour, the originality of science studies lies in demonstrating that facts are both real and constructed. The accusation of a postmodern hostility to science, thus, not only fails to recognize that science studies aims at a more robust understanding how science is done in practice, but also shows a fundamental misunderstanding of the methods and insights of science studies. Latour has emphatically problematized the rise of anti-scientific thinking and so-called "alternative facts". Latour states that the recent attacks against climate sciences and other disciplines demonstrate that there is a real war on science going on requiring a more intimate cooperation between science and science studies.

== Selected bibliography ==
=== Books ===
- Latour, Bruno; Woolgar, Steve (1986) [1979]. Laboratory life: the construction of scientific facts. Princeton, New Jersey: Princeton University Press. ISBN 978-0-691-09418-2. Originally published 1979 in Los Angeles, by SAGE Publications
- Latour, Bruno (1987). Science in action: how to follow scientists and engineers through society. Cambridge, Massachusetts: Harvard University Press. ISBN 978-0-674-79291-3.
- —— (1988). The pasteurization of France. Translated by Alan Sheridan and John Law. Cambridge, Massachusetts: Harvard University Press. ISBN 978-0-674-65761-8.
- —— (1993). We have never been modern. Translated by Catherine Porter. Cambridge, Massachusetts: Harvard University Press. ISBN 978-0-674-94839-6.
- —— (1996). Aramis, or the love of technology. Cambridge, Massachusetts: Harvard University Press. ISBN 978-0-674-04323-7.
- —— (1999). Pandora's hope: essays on the reality of science studies. Cambridge, Massachusetts: Harvard University Press. ISBN 978-0-674-65336-8.
- —— (2004). Politics of nature: how to bring the sciences into democracy. Translated by Catherine Porter. Cambridge, Massachusetts: Harvard University Press. ISBN 978-0-674-01347-6.
- ——; Weibel, Peter (2005). Making things public: atmospheres of democracy. Cambridge, Massachusetts Karlsruhe, Germany: MIT Press ZKM/Center for Art and Media in Karlsruhe. ISBN 978-0-262-12279-5.
- —— (2005). Reassembling the social: an introduction to actor-network-theory. Oxford New York: Oxford University Press. ISBN 978-0-19-925604-4.
- —— (2010). On the modern cult of the factish gods. Durham, North Carolina: Duke University Press. ISBN 978-0-8223-4825-2.
- —— (2010). The making of law: an ethnography of the Conseil d'Etat. Cambridge, UK Malden, Massachusetts: Polity. ISBN 978-0-7456-3985-7.
- —— (2013). Rejoicing: or the torments of religious speech. Translated by Julie Rose. Cambridge, UK: Polity. ISBN 978-0-7456-6007-3.
- —— (2013). An inquiry into modes of existence: an anthropology of the moderns. Translated by Catherine Porter. Cambridge, Massachusetts: Harvard University Press. ISBN 978-0-674-72499-0.
- —— (2017). Facing Gaia: Eight Lectures on the New Climatic Regime. Translated by Catherine Porter. Cambridge, United Kingdom: Polity Press. ISBN 978-0-7456-8433-8.
- —— (2018). Down to Earth: Politics in the New Climatic Regime. England: Polity Press. ISBN 978-1-5095-3059-5.
- —— (2021). After Lockdown: A Metamorphosis. England: Polity Press. ISBN 978-1-5095-5002-9.
- Latour, Bruno; Schultz, Nikolaj (2022). On the Emergence of an Ecological Class: A Memo. Polity Press. ISBN 978-1-509-55507-9.
- Latour, Bruno (2024). How to Inhabit the Earth. Interviews with Nicolas Truong. Translated by Julie Rose. Cambridge, UK: Polity Press. ISBN 978-1-5095-5946-6.

=== Chapters in books ===
- ——; Callon, Michel (1992), "Don't throw the baby out with the Bath School! A reply to Collins and Yearley", in Pickering, Andrew (ed.), Science as practice and culture, Chicago, Illinois: University of Chicago Press, pp. 343–368, ISBN 978-0-226-66801-7.
- —— (1992), "Where are the missing masses? The sociology of a few mundane artifacts", in Bijker, Wiebe E.; Law, John (eds.), Shaping technology/building society: studies in sociotechnical change, Cambridge, Massachusetts: MIT Press, pp. 225–258, ISBN 978-0-262-52194-9.
- ——; Akrich, Madeline (1992), "A summary of convenient vocabulary for the semiotics of human and nonhuman assemblies", in Bijker, Wiebe E.; Law, John (eds.), Shaping technology/building society: studies in sociotechnical change, Cambridge, Massachusetts: MIT Press, pp. 259–264, ISBN 978-0-262-52194-9.
- —— (1992), "Whose cosmos, which cosmopolitics? Comments on the peace terms of Ulrich Beck", in Robertson-von Trotha, Caroline Y. (ed.), Kultur und Gerechtigkeit (Kulturwissenschaft interdisziplinär/Interdisciplinary Studies on Culture and Society, Vol. 2), Baden-Baden: Nomos, ISBN 978-3-8329-2604-5.
- —— (2015), "Les « vues » de l'esprit. une introduction à l'anthropologie des sciences et des techniques" [The "views" of the mind: An introduction to the anthropology of science and technology], in Emmanuel Alloa (ed.), Penser l'image II. Anthropologies du visuel [Think on the image II: Anthropologies of the visual] (in French), Dijon: Les presses du réel, pp. 207–256, ISBN 978-2-84066-557-1

=== Journal articles ===
- —— (March 2000). "When things strike back: a possible contribution of 'science studies' to the social sciences" (PDF). British Journal of Sociology. 51 (1): 107–123. doi:10.1111/j.1468-4446.2000.00107.x.
- —— (2004). "Why has critique run out of steam? From matters of fact to matters of concern" (PDF). Critical Inquiry. 30 (2): 225–248. doi:10.1086/421123. S2CID 159523434.

== See also ==
- Materiality turn – Theoretical movement in organization studies
- New materialism
- Social construction of technology
- Technological determinism

== Honors and awards ==
- Officier of the Ordre des Palmes Académiques (2002
- Chevalier of the Order of the Legion of Honour (2011)
- Officier of the Ordre National du Mérite (2017)
