= Joan Fujimura =

American sociologist

- Born: Joan Hideko Fujimura
- Education: University of Washington; University of California, Berkeley
- Known for: Sociology of science
- Awards: Robert K. Merton Professional Book Award from the American Sociological Association (1998)
- Scientific career
- Fields: Sociology
- Workplaces: University of Wisconsin–Madison
- Thesis: Bandwagons in Science: Doable Problems and Transportable Packages as Factors in the Development of the Molecular Genetic Bandwagon in Cancer Research (1986)
- Doctoral advisor: Troy Duster

Joan Hideko Fujimura is an American sociologist and the emeritus Martindale-Bascom Professor of Sociology at the University of Wisconsin–Madison. She is the president of the Society for Social Studies of Science. She was a fellow of the Institute for Advanced Study from 1999 to 2001 and of the Center for Advanced Study in the Behavioral Sciences at Stanford University from 2014 to 2015.
