= Actor–network theory =

Theory within social science

Actor–network theory (ANT) is a theoretical and methodological approach to social theory where everything in the social and natural worlds exists in constantly shifting networks of relationships. It posits that nothing exists outside those relationships. All the factors involved in a social situation are on the same level, and thus there are no external social forces beyond what and how the network participants interact at present. Thus, objects, ideas, processes, and any other relevant factors are seen as just as important in creating social situations as humans.

ANT holds that social forces do not exist in themselves, and therefore cannot be used to explain social phenomena. Instead, strictly empirical analysis should be undertaken to "describe" rather than "explain" social activity. Only after this can one introduce the concept of social forces, and only as an abstract theoretical concept, not something which genuinely exists in the world.

Although it is best known for its controversial insistence on the capacity of nonhumans to act or participate in systems or networks or both, ANT is also associated with forceful critiques of conventional and critical sociology. Developed by science and technology studies (STS) scholars Michel Callon, Madeleine Akrich and Bruno Latour, the sociologist John Law, and others, it can more technically be described as a "material-semiotic" method. This means that it maps relations that are simultaneously material (between things) and semiotic (between concepts). It assumes that many relations are both material and semiotic.

The theory demonstrates that everything in the social and natural worlds, human and nonhuman, interacts in shifting networks of relationships without any other elements out of the networks. ANT challenges many traditional approaches by defining nonhumans as actors equal to humans. This claim provides a new perspective when applying the theory in practice.

Broadly speaking, ANT is a constructivist approach in that it avoids essentialist explanations of events or innovations (i.e. ANT explains a successful theory by understanding the combinations and interactions of elements that make it successful, rather than saying it is true and the others are false). Likewise, it is not a cohesive theory in itself. Rather, ANT functions as a strategy that assists people in being sensitive to terms and the often unexplored assumptions underlying them. It is distinguished from many other STS and sociological network theories for its distinct material-semiotic approach.

== Background and context ==
ANT was first developed at the Centre de Sociologie de l'Innovation (CSI) of the École nationale supérieure des mines de Paris in the early 1980s by staff (Michel Callon, Madeleine Akrich, Bruno Latour) and visitors (including John Law). The 1984 book co-authored by John Law and fellow-sociologist Peter Lodge (Science for Social Scientists; London: Macmillan Press Ltd.) is a good example of early explorations of how the growth and structure of knowledge could be analyzed and interpreted through the interactions of actors and networks. Initially created in an attempt to understand processes of innovation and knowledge-creation in science and technology, the approach drew on existing work in STS, on studies of large technological systems, and on a range of French intellectual resources including the semiotics of Algirdas Julien Greimas, the writing of philosopher Michel Serres, and the Annales School of history.

ANT appears to reflect many of the preoccupations of French post-structuralism, and in particular a concern with non-foundational and multiple material-semiotic relations. At the same time, it was much more firmly embedded in English-language academic traditions than most post-structuralist-influenced approaches. Its grounding in (predominantly English) science and technology studies was reflected in an intense commitment to the development of theory through qualitative empirical case-studies. Its links with largely US-originated work on large technical systems were reflected in its willingness to analyse large scale technological developments in an even-handed manner to include political, organizational, legal, technical and scientific factors.

Many of the characteristic ANT tools (including the notions of translation, generalized symmetry and the "heterogeneous network"), together with a scientometric tool for mapping innovations in science and technology ("co-word analysis") were initially developed during the 1980s, predominantly in and around the CSI. The "state of the art" of ANT in the late 1980s is well-described in Latour's 1987 text, Science in Action.

From about 1990 onwards, ANT started to become popular as a tool for analysis in a range of fields beyond STS. It was picked up and developed by authors in parts of organizational analysis, informatics, health studies, geography, sociology, anthropology, archaeology, feminist studies, technical communication, and economics.

As of 2008, ANT is a widespread, if controversial, range of material-semiotic approaches for the analysis of heterogeneous relations. In part because of its popularity, it is interpreted and used in a wide range of alternative and sometimes incompatible ways. There is no orthodoxy in current ANT, and different authors use the approach in substantially different ways. Some authors talk of "after-ANT" to refer to "successor projects" blending together different problem-focuses with those of ANT.

== Key concepts ==
=== Actor/Actant ===
An actor (actant) is that which acts and causes action. It implies no motivation of human individual actors nor of humans in general. An actant can literally be anything provided it is granted to be the source of action. In another word, an actor, in this circumstance, is considered as any entity that does things. For example, in the "Pasteur Network", microorganisms are not inert, they cause unsterilized materials to ferment while leaving behind sterilized materials not affected. If they took other actions, that is, if they did not cooperate with Pasteur – if they did not take action (at least according to Pasteur's intentions) – then Pasteur's story may be a bit different. It is in this sense that Latour can refer to microorganisms as actors.

Under the framework of ANT, the principle of generalized symmetry requires all entities must be described in the same terms before a network is considered. Any differences between entities are generated in the network of relations, and do not exist before any network is applied.

==== Human actors ====
Human normally refers to human beings and their human behaviors.

==== Nonhuman actors ====
Traditionally, nonhuman entities are creatures including plants, animals, geology, and natural forces, as well as a collective human making of arts, languages. In ANT, nonhuman covers multiple entities including things, objects, animals, natural phenomena, material structures, transportation devices, texts, and economic goods. But nonhuman actors do not cover entities such as humans, supernatural beings, and other symbolic objects in nature.

=== Actor-Network ===
As the term implies, the actor-network is the central concept in ANT. The term "network" is somewhat problematic in that it, as Latour notes, has a number of unwanted connotations. Firstly, it implies that what is described takes the shape of a network, which is not necessarily the case. Secondly, it implies "transportation without deformation," which, in ANT, is not possible since any actor-network involves a vast number of translations. Latour, however, still contends that network is a fitting term to use, because "it has no a priori order relation; it is not tied to the axiological myth of a top and of a bottom of society; it makes absolutely no assumption whether a specific locus is macro- or micro- and does not modify the tools to study the element 'a' or the element 'b'." This use of the term "network" is very similar to Deleuze and Guattari's rhizomes; Latour even remarks tongue-in-cheek that he would have no objection to renaming ANT "actant-rhizome ontology" if it only had sounded better, which hints at Latour's uneasiness with the word "theory".

Actor–network theory tries to explain how material–semiotic networks come together to act as a whole; the clusters of actors involved in creating meaning are both material and semiotic. As a part of this it may look at explicit strategies for relating different elements together into a network so that they form an apparently coherent whole. These networks are potentially transient, existing in a constant making and re-making. This means that relations need to be repeatedly "performed" or the network will dissolve. They also assume that networks of relations are not intrinsically coherent, and may indeed contain conflicts. Social relations, in other words, are only ever in process, and must be performed continuously.

The Pasteur story that was mentioned above introduced the patterned network of diverse materials, which is called the idea of 'heterogenous networks'. The basic idea of patterned network is that human is not the only factor or contributor in the society, or in any social activities and networks. Thus, the network composes machines, animals, things, and any other objects. For those nonhuman actors, it might be hard for people to imagine their roles in the network. For example, say two people, Jacob and Mike, are speaking through texts. Within the current technology, they are able to communicate with each other without seeing each other in person. Therefore, when typing or writing, the communication is basically not mediated by either of them, but instead by a network of objects, like their computers or cell phones.

If taken to its logical conclusion, then, nearly any actor can be considered merely a sum of other, smaller actors. A car is an example of a complicated system. It contains many electronic and mechanical components, all of which are essentially hidden from view to the driver, who simply deals with the car as a single object. This effect is known as punctualisation, and is similar to the idea of encapsulation in object-oriented programming.

When an actor network breaks down, the punctualisation effect tends to cease as well. In the automobile example above, a non-working engine would cause the driver to become aware of the car as a collection of parts rather than just a vehicle capable of transporting them from place to place. This can also occur when elements of a network act contrarily to the network as a whole. In his book Pandora's Hope, Latour likens depunctualization to the opening of a black box. When closed, the box is perceived simply as a box, although when it is opened all elements inside it become visible.

=== Translation ===
Central to ANT is the concept of translation which is sometimes referred to as sociology of translation, in which innovators attempt to create a forum, a central network in which all the actors agree that the network is worth building and defending. In his widely debated 1986 study of how marine biologists tried to restock the St Brieuc Bay in order to produce more scallops, Michel Callon defined 4 moments of translation:

1. Problematisation: The researchers attempted to make themselves important to the other players in the drama by identifying their nature and issues, then claiming that they could be remedied if the actors negotiated the 'obligatory passage point' of the researchers' study program.
2. Interessement: A series of procedures used by the researchers to bind the other actors to the parts that had been assigned to them in that program.
3. Enrollment: A collection of tactics used by the researchers to define and connect the numerous roles they had assigned to others.
4. Mobilisation: The researchers utilized a series of approaches to ensure that ostensible spokespeople for various key collectivities were appropriately able to represent those collectivities and were not deceived by the latter.

Also important to the notion is the role of network objects in helping to smooth out the translation process by creating equivalencies between what would otherwise be very challenging people, organizations or conditions to mesh together. Bruno Latour spoke about this particular task of objects in his work Reassembling the Social.

=== Quasi-object ===
For the rethinking of social relations as networks, Latour mobilizes a concept from Michel Serres and expands on it in order “to locate the position of these strange new hybrids”. Quasi-objects are simultaneously quasi-subjects – the prefix quasi denotes that neither ontological status as subject or object is pure or permanent, but that these are dynamic entities whose status shifts, depending on their respective momentous activity and their according position in a collective or network. What is decisive is circulation and participation, from which networks emerge, examples for quasi-objects are language, money, bread, love, or the ball in a soccer game: all of these human or non-human, material or immaterial actants have no agency (and thus, subject-status) in themselves, however, they can be seen as the connective tissue underlying – or even activating – the interactions in which they are enmeshed. In Reassembling the Social, Latour refers to these in-between actants as “the mediators whose proliferation generates, among many other entities, what could be called quasi-objects and quasi-subjects.”

Actor–network theory refers to these creations as tokens or quasi-objects which are passed between actors within the network. As the token is increasingly transmitted or passed through the network, it becomes increasingly punctualized and also increasingly reified. When the token is decreasingly transmitted, or when an actor fails to transmit the token (e.g., the oil pump breaks), punctualization and reification are decreased as well.

== Other central concepts ==
=== A material semiotic method ===
Although it is called a "theory", ANT does not usually explain "why" a network takes the form that it does. Rather, ANT is a way of thoroughly exploring the relational ties within a network (which can be a multitude of different things). As Latour notes, "explanation does not follow from description; it is description taken that much further." It is not, in other words, a theory "of" anything, but rather a method, or a "how-to book" as Latour puts it.

The approach is related to other versions of material-semiotics (notably the work of philosophers Gilles Deleuze, Michel Foucault, and feminist scholar Donna Haraway). It can also be seen as a way of being faithful to the insights of ethnomethodology and its detailed descriptions of how common activities, habits and procedures sustain themselves. Similarities between ANT and symbolic interactionist approaches such as the newer forms of grounded theory like situational analysis, exist, although Latour objects to such a comparison.

Although ANT is mostly associated with studies of science and technology and with the sociology of science, it has been making steady progress in other fields of sociology as well. ANT is adamantly empirical, and as such yields useful insights and tools for sociological inquiry in general. ANT has been deployed in studies of identity and subjectivity, urban transportation systems, and passion and addiction. It also makes steady progress in political and historical sociology.

=== Intermediaries and mediators ===
The distinction between intermediaries and mediators is key to ANT sociology. Intermediaries are entities which make no difference (to some interesting state of affairs which we are studying) and so can be ignored. They transport the force of some other entity more or less without transformation and so are fairly uninteresting. Mediators are entities which multiply difference and so should be the object of study. Their outputs cannot be predicted by their inputs. From an ANT point of view sociology has tended to treat too much of the world as intermediaries.

For instance, a sociologist might take silk and nylon as intermediaries, holding that the former "means", "reflects", or "symbolises" the upper classes and the latter the lower classes. In such a view the real world silk–nylon difference is irrelevant– presumably many other material differences could also, and do also, transport this class distinction. But taken as mediators these fabrics would have to be engaged with by the analyst in their specificity: the internal real-world complexities of silk and nylon suddenly appear relevant, and are seen as actively constructing the ideological class distinction which they once merely reflected.

For the committed ANT analyst, social things—like class distinctions in taste in the silk and nylon example, but also groups and power—must constantly be constructed or performed anew through complex engagements with complex mediators. There is no stand-alone social repertoire lying in the background to be reflected off, expressed through, or substantiated in, interactions (as in an intermediary conception).

=== Reflexivity ===
Bruno Latour's articulation of reflexivity in Actor-Network Theory (ANT) reframes it as an opportunity rather than a problem. His argument addresses the limitations of reflexivity as traditionally conceived in relativist epistemologies and replaces it with a pragmatic, relational approach tied to ANT's broader principles. Latour argues that the observer is merely one actor among many within the network, eliminating the problem of reflexivity as a paradox of status. Reflexivity instead emerges through the tangible work of navigating and translating between networks, requiring the observer to engage actively, like any other actor, in the labour of connection and translation. This grounded form of reflexivity enhances the observer's role as a "world builder" and reinforces ANT's emphasis on the relational and dynamic nature of knowledge creation.

=== Hybridity ===
The belief that neither a human nor a nonhuman is pure, in the sense that neither is human or nonhuman in an absolute sense, but rather beings created via interactions between the two. Humans are thus regarded as quasi-subjects, while nonhumans are regarded as quasi-objects.

== Actor–network theory and specific disciplines ==
Recently, there has been a movement to introduce actor network theory as an analytical tool to a range of applied disciplines outside of sociology, including nursing, public health, urban studies (Farias and Bender, 2010), and community, urban, and regional planning (Beauregard, 2012; Beauregard and Lieto, 2015; Rydin, 2012; Rydin and Tate, 2016, Tate, 2013).

=== International relations ===
Actor–network theory has become increasingly prominent within the discipline of international relations and political science.

Theoretically, scholars within IR have employed ANT in order to disrupt traditional world political binaries (civilised/barbarian, democratic/autocratic, etc.), consider the implications of a posthuman understanding of IR, explore the infrastructures of world politics, and consider the effects of technological agency.

Empirically, IR scholars have drawn on insights from ANT in order to study phenomena including political violences like the use of torture and drones, piracy and maritime governance, and garbage.

=== Design ===
The actor–network theory can also be applied to design, using a perspective that is not simply limited to an analysis of an object's structure. From the ANT viewpoint, design is seen as a series of features that account for a social, psychological, and economical world. ANT argues that objects are designed to shape human action and mold or influence decisions. In this way, the objects' design serves to mediate human relationships and can even impact our morality, ethics, and politics.

=== Literary criticism ===
The literary critic Rita Felski has argued that ANT offers the fields of literary criticism and cultural studies vital new modes of interpreting and engaging with literary texts. She claims that Latour's model has the capacity to allow "us to wiggle out of the straitjacket of suspicion," and to offer meaningful solutions to the problems associated with critique. The theory has been crucial to her formulation of postcritique. Felski suggests that the purpose of applying ANT to literary studies "is no longer to diminish or subtract from the reality of the texts we study but to amplify their reality, as energetic coactors and vital partners."

=== Anthropology of religion ===
In the study of Christianity by anthropologists, the ANT has been employed in a variety of ways of understanding how humans interact with nonhuman actors. Some have been critical of the field of Anthropology of Religion in its tendency to presume that God is not a social actor. The ANT is used to problematize the role of God, as a nonhuman actor, and speak of how They affect religious practice. Others have used the ANT to speak of the structures and placements of religious buildings, especially in cross-cultural contexts, which can see architecture as agents making God's presence tangible.

== ANT in Practice ==
ANT has been considered more than just a theory, but also a methodology. In fact, ANT is a useful method that can be applied in different studies. Moreover, with the development of the digital communication, ANT now is popular in being applied in science field like IS research. In addition, it widen the horizon of researchers from arts field as well.

=== ANT in arts ===
Actor-network theory (ANT) has increasingly influenced design research and practice. While design was historically conceptualized primarily as a medium for human interaction and action, the integration of ANT principles repositions design as a relational connector. This shift has elevated the perceived significance of design in daily life, leading scholars to analyze how designed objects shape, reflect, and mediate everyday activities.

ANT has also been widely applied in museums. ANT proposes that it is difficult to discern the 'hard' from the 'soft' components of the apparatus in curatorial practice; that the object 'in progress' of being curated is slick and difficult to separate from the setting of the experiment or the experimenter's identity.

=== ANT in science ===
In recent years, actor-network theory has gained a lot of traction, and a growing number of IS academics are using it explicitly in their research. Despite the fact that these applications vary greatly, all of the scholars cited below agree that the theory provides new notions and ideas for understanding the socio-technical character of information systems. Bloomfield present an intriguing case study of the development of a specific set of resource management information systems in the UK National Health Service, and they evaluate their findings using concepts from actor-network theory. The actor-network approach does not prioritize social or technological aspects, which mirrors the situation in the case study, where arguments about social structures and technology are intertwined within actors' discourse as they try to persuade others to align with their own goals. The research emphasizes the interpretative flexibility of information technology and systems, in the sense that seemingly similar systems produce drastically different outcomes in different locales as a result of the specific translation and network-building processes that occurred. They show how the boundary between the technological and the social, as well as the link between them, is the topic of constant battles and trials of strength in the creation of facts, rather than taking technology for granted.

== Impact of ANT ==
=== Contributions of nonhuman actors ===
There are at least four contributions of nonhumans as actors in their ANT positions.

1. Nonhuman actors can be considered as a condition in human social activities. Through the human's formation of nonhuman actors such as durable materials, they provide a stable foundation for interactions in society. Reciprocally, nonhumans' actions and capacities serve as a condition for the possibility of the formation of society.
  - In Latour's We Have Never Been Modern, his conceptual "parliament of things" consists of social, natural, and discourse together as hybrids. Although the interlocks between human actors and nonhumans effects the modernized society, this parliamentary setting based on nonhuman actors would eliminate such fake modernization, and changes the dichotomy between modern society and premodern society.
2. Nonhuman actors can be considered as mediators. On the one hand, nonhumans could constantly modify relations between actors. On the other hand, nonhumans share the same features with other actors not solely as means for human actors. In this circumstance, nonhuman actors impact human interactions. It either creates an atmosphere for humans to agree with each other, or lead to conflict as the mediators.
  - It is noticeable that the status of mediation is more affiliated with intermediaries or means as a stable presence in the corpus of ANT, while mediators function more powers to influence actors and networks. Technical mediation exerts itself on four dimensions: interference, composition, the folding of time and space, and crossing the boundary between signs and things.
3. Nonhuman actors can be considered as members of moral and political associations. For example, noise is a nonhuman actor if the topic is applied to actor-network theory. Noise is the criteria for humans to regulate themselves to morality, and subject to the limitations inherent in some legal rules for its political effects. After nonhumans are visible actors through their associations with morality and politics, these collectives become inherently regulative principles in social networks.
4. Nonhuman actors can be considered as gatherings. Alike nonhumans' impacts on morality and politics, they could gather actors from other times and spaces. Interacted with variable ontologies, times, spaces, and durability, nonhumans exert subtle influences within a network.

== Criticism ==
Some critics have argued that research based on ANT perspectives remains entirely descriptive and fails to provide explanations for social processes. ANT—like comparable social scientific methods—requires judgement calls from the researcher as to which actors are important within a network and which are not. Critics argue that the importance of particular actors cannot be determined in the absence of "out-of-network" criteria, such as is a logically proven fact about deceptively coherent systems given Gödel's incompleteness theorems. Similarly, others argue that actor-networks risk degenerating into endless chains of association (six degrees of separation—we are all networked to one another). Other research perspectives such as social constructionism, social shaping of technology, social network theory, normalization process theory, and diffusion of innovations theory are held to be important alternatives to ANT approaches.

=== From STS itself and organizational studies ===
Key early criticism came from other members of the STS community, in particular the "Epistemological Chicken" debate between Collins and Yearley with responses from Latour and Callon as well as Woolgar. In an article in Science as Practice and Culture, sociologist Harry Collins and his co-writer Steven Yearley argue that the ANT approach is a step backwards towards the positivist and realist positions held by early theory of science. Collins and Yearley accused ANTs approach of collapsing into an endless relativist regress.

Whittle and organization studies professor André Spicer note that "ANT has also sought to move beyond deterministic models that trace organizational phenomena back to powerful individuals, social structures, hegemonic discourses or technological effects. Rather, ANT prefers to seek out complex patterns of causality rooted in connections between actors." They argue that ANT's ontological realism makes it "less well equipped for pursuing a critical account of organizations—that is, one which recognises the unfolding nature of reality, considers the limits of knowledge and seeks to challenge structures of domination." This implies that ANT does not account for pre-existing structures, such as power, but rather sees these structures as emerging from the actions of actors within the network and their ability to align in pursuit of their interests. Accordingly, ANT can be seen as an attempt to re-introduce Whig history into science and technology studies; like the myth of the heroic inventor, ANT can be seen as an attempt to explain successful innovators by saying only that they were successful. Likewise, for organization studies, Whittle and Spicer assert that ANT is, "ill-suited to the task of developing political alternatives to the imaginaries of market managerialism."

=== Human agency ===
Actor–network theory insists on the capacity of nonhumans to be actors or participants in networks and systems. Critics including figures such as Langdon Winner maintain that such properties as intentionality fundamentally distinguish humans from animals or from "things" (see Activity Theory). ANT scholars [who?] respond with the following arguments:

- They do not attribute intentionality and similar properties to nonhumans.
- Their conception of agency does not presuppose intentionality.
- They locate agency neither in human "subjects" nor in nonhuman "objects", but in heterogeneous associations of humans and nonhumans.

ANT has been criticized as amoral. Wiebe Bijker has responded to this criticism by stating that the amorality of ANT is not a necessity. Moral and political positions are possible, but one must first describe the network before taking up such positions. This position has been further explored by Stuart Shapiro who contrasts ANT with the history of ecology, and argues that research decisions are moral rather than methodological, but this moral dimension has been sidelined.

=== Misnaming ===
In a workshop called "On Recalling ANT", Latour himself stated that there are four things wrong with actor-network theory: "actor", "network", "theory" and the hyphen. In a later book, however, Latour reversed himself, accepting the wide use of the term, "including the hyphen." He further remarked how he had been helpfully reminded that the ANT acronym "was perfectly fit for a blind, myopic, workaholic, trail-sniffing, and collective traveler"—qualitative hallmarks of actor-network epistemology.

== See also ==
- Annemarie Mol
- Helen Verran
- Mapping controversies
- Science and technology studies (STS)
- Obligatory passage point (OPP)
- Social construction of technology (SCOT)
- Technology dynamics
- Theory of structuration (according to which neither agents nor social structure have primacy)
- Thing theory
- Outline of organizational theory
