= Wiebe Bijker =

Dutch academic

Wiebe E. Bijker
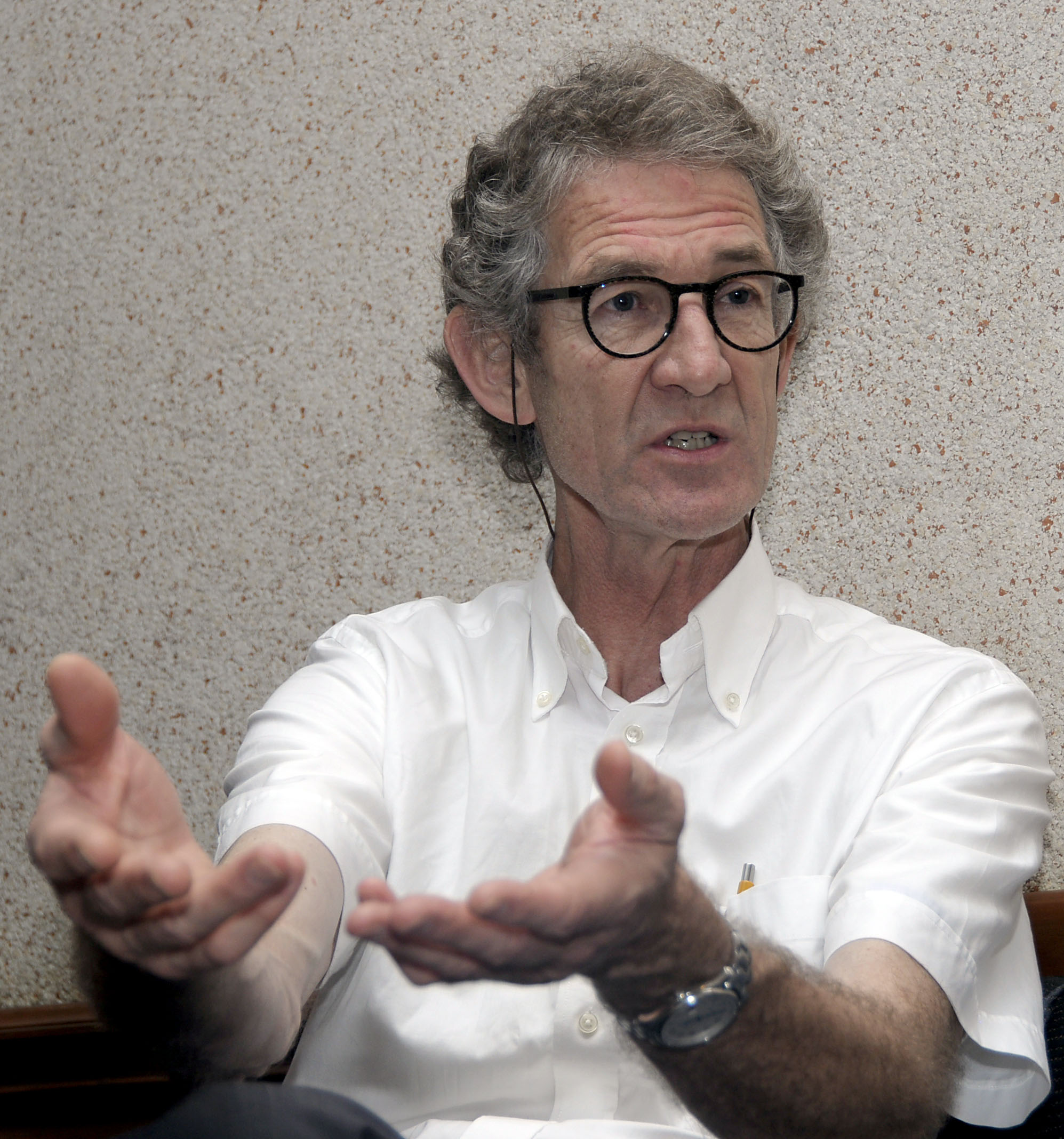
- Born: 19 March 1951 (age 75)

Education
- Education: University of Twente

Philosophical work
- Notable ideas: Social Construction of Technology-approach
- Website: https://www.maastrichtuniversity.nl/w.bijker

Wiebe E. Bijker (born 19 March 1951, Delft) is a Dutch professor Emeritus, former chair of the Department of Social Science and Technology at Maastricht University in the Netherlands.

== Early life ==
Bijker's father was an engineer involved in implementing the Delta Plan after a disastrous dike breach in the Netherlands in 1953 when young Bijker was two years old and later became deputy director of the Delft Hydraulics Laboratory. Presumably, the unique fact of parts of the Netherlands being below sea level, the well-known concerns in innovation surrounding this condition for centuries, and his father's involvement all contributed to the younger Bijker's interest in technology studies.

== Education ==
After finishing Gymnasium in Emmeloord (1969), the younger Bijker received his BSc degree in philosophy from the University of Amsterdam (1974), his engineer's degree in physical engineering from the Delft University of Technology (1976), and his PhD degree from the University of Twente in 1990.

== Career ==
Bijker was an assistant and associate professor of philosophy from 1987 at the Maastricht University before becoming full professor of technology and society in 1994. Bijker's fields of research include social and historical studies of science, technology and society; theories of technology development; methodology of science, technology and society studies; democratisation of technological culture; science and technology policies; ICT, multimedia and the social-cultural dimensions of the information society; gender and technology; and meta studies of architecture, planning, and civil engineering. With Trevor Pinch he is considered as one of the main adherents of the Social Construction of Technology-approach, (SCOT) their 1984 article "The Social Construction of Facts and Artefacts: or How the Sociology of Science and the Sociology of Technology might Benefit Each Other" is cited as the first substantive work to elaborate on the SCOT perspective. Central to the SCOT theoretical framework is the idea of 'interpretive flexibility', that is that the products of scientific and technological endeavours are not fixed on a given trajectory determined by a physical nature, but rather interact with the social environments in which they are produced. To illustrate their theorectical argument Pinch and Bijker, in their 1984 article, use the development of the bicycle and the substantive shaping of this through the influences of various user groups, manufacturers and interested others.

On 12 May 2017 Wiebe Bijker became emeritus professor.

== Selected publications ==
=== Books ===
- Bijker, Wiebe E.; Hughes, Thomas P.; Pinch, Trevor (1987). The social construction of technological systems: new directions in the sociology and history of technology. Cambridge, Massachusetts: MIT Press. ISBN 9780262022620.
- Bijker, Wiebe E.; Law, John (1992). Shaping technology/building society: studies in sociotechnical change. Cambridge, Massachusetts: MIT Press. ISBN 9780262521949.
- Bijker, Wiebe E. (1995). Of bicycles, bakelites, and bulbs: toward a theory of sociotechnical change. Cambridge, Massachusetts: MIT Press. ISBN 9780262023764.
- Bijker, Wiebe E.; van Lieshout, Marc; Egyedi, Tineke M. (2001). Social learning technologies: the introduction of multimedia in education. Aldershot, England Burlington, Vermont: Ashgate. ISBN 9780754614098.
- Bijker, Wiebe E.; Bal, Roland; Hendriks, Ruud (2009). The paradox of scientific authority: the role of scientific advice in democracies. Cambridge, Massachusetts: MIT Press. ISBN 9780262258609.
- Bijker, Wiebe E.; Hommels, Anique; Mesman, Jessica (2014). Vulnerability in technological cultures: new directions in research and governance. Cambridge, Massachusetts: MIT Press. ISBN 9780262525800.

=== Journal articles ===
- Bijker, Wiebe E. (January 2010). "How is technology made? – That is the question!". Cambridge Journal of Economics. 34 (1): 63–76. doi:10.1093/cje/bep068.

== See also ==
- Science and technology studies
- Sociology of scientific knowledge
- Sociotechnology
