= John Law (sociologist) =

British sociologist (born 1946)

- Born: 16 May 1946 (age 80)
- Awards: John Desmond Bernal Prize

Academic background
- Education: University of Edinburgh
- Thesis: Specialties in Science: A Sociological Study of X-ray Protein Crystallography

Academic work
- Discipline: Sociology, Science and technology studies
- Main interests: Actor-network theory
- Notable works: "Provincialising STS" (2015) "STS as Method" (2015); After Method (2004); Aircraft Stories (2002) "Notes on Materiality and Sociality" (with Annemarie Mol, 1995); A Sociology of Monsters (editor, 1991) "Technology and Heterogeneous Engineering: the Case of the Portuguese Expansion" (1987, in The Social Construction of Technological Systems)
- Notable ideas: Heterogeneous engineering
- Website: http://heterogeneities.net/

Notes
- A director of the ESRC funded Centre for Research on Socio-Cultural Change

John Law (born 16 May 1946), is a sociologist and science and technology studies scholar, currently on the Faculty of Social Sciences at the Open University. He has remained one of the leading proponents of Actor-Network Theory together with Madeleine Akrich, Michel Callon and Bruno Latour.

== Actor-network theory ==
Actor-network theory, sometimes abbreviated to ANT, is a social science approach for describing and explaining social, organisational, scientific and technological structures, processes and events. It assumes that all the components of such structures (whether these are human or otherwise) form a network of relations that can be mapped and described in the same terms or vocabulary.

Developed by STS scholars Michel Callon, Madeleine Akrich and Bruno Latour, Law himself, and others, ANT may alternatively be described as a 'material-semiotic' method. ANT strives to map relations that are simultaneously material (between things) and 'semiotic' (between concepts), for instance, the interactions in a bank involve both people and their ideas, and computers. Together these form a single network.

Professor John Law was one of the directors of the ESRC funded Centre for Research on Socio-Cultural Change.

== Bibliography ==
=== Authored ===
- Law, John; Lodge, Peter (1984). Science for social scientists. London: Macmillan Press. ISBN 9780333351017. OCLC 20492048.
- Law, John (1994). Organizing modernity: social ordering and social theory. Oxford, UK Cambridge, Massachusetts, USA: Blackwell. ISBN 9780631185130. OCLC 901782885.
- Law, John (2002). Aircraft stories: decentering the object in technoscience. Durham, North Carolina: Duke University Press. ISBN 9780822328247. OCLC 231972039.
- Law, John (2004). After method: mess in social science research. London New York: Routledge. ISBN 9780415341752. OCLC 989163983.
- Bowman, Andrew; Ertürk, Ismail; Froud, Julie; Johal, Sukhdev; Law, John; Lever, Adam; Moran, Michael; Williams, Karel (2014). The end of the experiment? Reframing the foundational economy. Manchester: Manchester University Press. ISBN 9780719096334. OCLC 934513178.

=== Edited ===
- Law, John; Callon, Michel; Rip, Arie, eds. (1986). Mapping the dynamics of science and technology: sociology of science in the real world. Basingstoke: Macmillan. ISBN 9780333372234. OCLC 254959355.
- Law, John, ed. (1986). Power, action, and belief: a new sociology of knowledge. London Boston: Routledge & Kegan Paul. ISBN 9780710208026. OCLC 901422036.
- Fyfe, Gordon; Law, John, eds. (1988). Picturing power: visual depiction and social relations. London: Routledge. ISBN 9780415031448. OCLC 802667909.
- Law, John, ed. (1991). A sociology of monsters: essays on power, technology, and domination. London New York: Routledge. ISBN 9780415071390. OCLC 902188595.
- Bijker, Wiebe E.; Law, John, eds. (1992). Shaping technology/building society: studies in sociotechnical change. Cambridge, Massachusetts: MIT Press. ISBN 9780262521949. OCLC 838028387.
- Brenna, Brita; Law, John; Moser, Ingunn, eds. (1998). Machines, agency and desire. Oslo: Center for Technology and Culture. ISBN 9788213013093. OCLC 807626021.
- Law, John; Hassard, John, eds. (1999). Actor network theory and after. Oxford England Malden, Massachusetts: Blackwell/Sociological Review. ISBN 9780631211945. OCLC 939893096.
- Law, John; Mol, Annemarie, eds. (2002). Complexities: social studies of knowledge practices. Durham, North Carolina: Duke University Press. ISBN 9780822328469. OCLC 751357043.
- Law, John; Ruppert, Evelyn, eds. (2016). Modes of knowing: resources from the Baroque. Manchester: Mattering Press. ISBN 9780993144981. OCLC 989957904.

== See also ==
- Actor-network theory
- Bruno Latour
- Michel Callon
- Annemarie Mol
