= Frederick Merk =

American historian

- Born: August 15, 1887; Milwaukee, Wisconsin, U.S.
- Died: September 24, 1977 (aged 90); Cambridge, Massachusetts, U.S.
- Education: University of Wisconsin; Harvard University
- Scientific career
- Fields: American History
- Workplaces: Harvard University
- Doctoral advisor: Frederick Jackson Turner
- Doctoral students: John Morton Blum, Paul Wallace Gates, Rodman W. Paul, Alfred D. Chandler, Jr., Bradford Perkins, Elting E. Morison, Samuel P. Hays
- Other notable students: Henry Friendly

Frederick Merk (August 15, 1887 – September 24, 1977) was an American historian. He taught at Harvard University from 1924 to 1956.

== Biography ==
Frederick Merk was born in Milwaukee, Wisconsin in 1887. He graduated from the University of Wisconsin in 1911 and then worked for five years at the Wisconsin Historical Society. In 1916 he went to Harvard University to study under Frederick Jackson Turner. Upon Turner's retirement in 1924, Merk took up his position with Turner's support. He taught at Harvard until 1956, and oversaw several dozen graduate students.

== Scholarly impact ==
John Morton Blum, one of Merk's graduate students after World War II, recalled of his mentor that Merk emphasized integrity, "an integrity of mind and process, of the way in which to understand and to write history, an integrity by his standards so severe that perhaps no one of his students could ever achieve it, but a quality he made so important that all of them would try."

== Bibliography ==
- Thwaites, Reuben Gold; Tilton, Asa; Merk, Frederick, eds. (1912). Civil War Messages and Proclamations of Wisconsin War Governors. Madison: Wisconsin History Commission.
- Merk, Frederick (1916). Economic History of Wisconsin During the Civil War Decade. Madison: Wisconsin Historical Society.
- Turner, Frederick Jackson; Merk, Frederick (1922). List of References On the History of the West. Cambridge: Harvard University Press.
- Merk, Frederick (1950). Albert Gallatin and the Oregon Problem; A Study in Anglo-American Diplomacy. Cambridge: Harvard University Press. OCLC 273263.
- Merk, Frederick; Merk, Lois Bannister (1967). The Monroe Doctrine and American Expansionism, 1843-1849. New York: Knopf. OCLC 222573842.
- Merk, Frederick; Merk, Lois Bannister (1972). Slavery and the Annexation of Texas. New York: Knopf. OCLC 633971086.
- Merk, Frederick; Merk, Lois Bannister (1983). Manifest Destiny and Mission in American History: A Reinterpretation. Westport, CT: Greenwood Press. OCLC 681405368.
- Merk, Frederick (1985). History of the Westward Movement. New York: Alfred A. Knopf. OCLC 470801839.
