= LTSS =

LTSS can mean:

- Lutheran Theological Southern Seminary
- Livermore Time Sharing System
- Long-Term Support and Service (or Long-Term Services and Support)
  - in medical language (also long-term care), concerning people with disabilities
  - in data-processing language, it means extended support of software (usually enterprise software)
- Looney Tunes Super Stars, a series of Looney Tunes DVDs
- Lord Tweedsmuir Secondary School, a high school near Vancouver, British Columbia

LTSs is also sometimes used as the plural of LTS, which can mean:

- Large technical system
- Labelled transition system
