= NASA Historical Advisory Committee =

The National Aeronautics and Space Administration (NASA) Historical Advisory Committee was a committee of historians that was established in 1964.

== History ==
The NASA Historical Office was established under its first chief historian, Dr. Eugene Emme in 1960. The committee was first made up of a wide variety of members, who initially sought to find support and prestige for the new historical program. From 1969 to 1970, the committee began to be increasingly composed of professional historians from universities, who made known their dissatisfaction with the NASA historical program. As a result, the Historical Advisory Committee was reduced in size and reorganized to be composed of only university-based professional historians to oversee the work of the NASA Historical Office.

== Chairmen ==
- Wood Gray, 1964-1966
- Melvin Kranzeberg, 1966-1970
- Louis Morton, 1970-
- Walter Rundell

== Members ==
- Daniel J. Boorstin
- David Bushnell
- James L. Cate, 1964-
- A. Hunter Dupree
- I. B. Holley
- Thomas P. Hughes
- Elting E. Morison, 1972-
- Robert P. Multhauf
- Rodman W. Paul
- Robert L. Perry
- John B. Rae

== Sources ==
- Rodman W. Paul, "Historical Advisory Committees: NASA and the National Archives," Pacific Historical Review, vol. 44, no. 3 (August 1975), pp. 385–394.
