= Rescuing Prometheus =

1998 book by Thomas P. Hughes

Rescuing Prometheus: Four Monumental Projects That Changed the Modern World (1998) is a book by Thomas P. Hughes. The book uses four extremely large engineering projects of the late 20th century as examples to explore how the limits of modern system engineering are stressed by real life projects. It also traces the development of the management of large technical systems development.

The book documents four massively-cooperative projects:

- Semi-Automatic Ground Environment (SAGE), a computer- and radar-based air-defense system
- The Atlas project, which produced America's first ICBM
- Boston's Central Artery/Tunnel Project, a traffic-unclogging system of highways, tunnels and bridges originally scheduled for completion in 2004
- ARPANET, an interactive computer-based information network that paved the way for the Internet

== See also ==
- Large Technical System
