= Rodman W. Paul =

American historian

- Born: November 6, 1912; Philadelphia, Pennsylvania, U.S.
- Died: May 15, 1987 (aged 74); Pasadena, California, U.S.
- Education: Harvard University
- Occupation: Historian Teacher at California Institute of Technology

Rodman Wilson Paul (November 6, 1912 – May 15, 1987) was an American historian who taught at the California Institute of Technology. He was known primarily as a foremost authority on California mining and agricultural Native American history.

== Life and career ==
Paul was born in Philadelphia and raised near Boston, Massachusetts. He received his AB (1936), AM (1937) and PhD (1943) from Harvard. His PhD adviser at Harvard was Frederick Merk. From 1943 to 1946 he served in the Navy Reserve. In 1947 he went to Caltech. His choice for going there was partly based on an interest he developed in the history of the far West after a trip he took to Arizona to recuperate from an illness. He eventually became the Edward S. Harkness Professor of History. After retirement in 1972, he continued work as a researcher at the Huntington Library. he died in 1987 at age 74

Paul wrote many books and articles, and was recognized with several awards including the 1984 Henry R. Wagner Memorial Award. He earned the Guggenheim Fellowship for Humanities award and he was a fellow of the California Historical Society, served on the board of the Pasadena and Santa Barbara historical societies, and was a member of the NASA Historical Advisory Committee. The Mining History Association's Rodman Paul Award recognizes individuals who have contributed to the understanding of American mining history.

== Bibliography ==
The following is a selected list of the works of Rodman Paul. Not listed are his many book reviews of works by other authors.

=== Books ===
- Paul, Rodman W. (1969). California Gold: The Beginning of Mining in the Far West. Lincoln: Univ. of Nebraska Press. ISBN 0803251491. OCLC 632259962.
- Paul, Rodman W.; Etulain, Richard W. (1977). The Frontier and the American West. Arlington Heights, IL: AHM Pub. Corp. OCLC 3420752.
- Paul, Rodman W. (1977). When Culture Came to Boise: Mary Hallock Foote in Idaho. Boise, Idaho: Idaho State Historical Society. OCLC 21726020.
- Paul, Rodman W. (1988). The Far West and the Great Plains In Transition, 1859-1900. New York: Harper & Row. ISBN 0060158360.
- Paul, Rodman W.; West, Elliott (2001). Mining Frontiers of the Far West, 1848-1880. Albuquerque: University of New Mexico Press. OCLC 47044852.

=== Articles ===
- Paul, Rodman W. (Sep 1938). "The Origin of the Chinese Issue in California". The Mississippi Valley Historical Review. 25 (2). Organization of American Historians: 181–196. doi:10.2307/1896498. JSTOR 1896498.
- Paul, Rodman Wilson (Nov 1958). "The Great California Grain War: The Grangers Challenge the Wheat King". Pacific Historical Review. 27 (4). University of California Press: 331–349. doi:10.2307/3636810. JSTOR 3636810.
- Paul, Rodman Wilson (Jun 1960). "Colorado as a Pioneer of Science in the Mining West". The Mississippi Valley Historical Review. 47 (1). Organization of American Historians: 34–50. doi:10.2307/1891277. JSTOR 1891277.
- Paul, Rodman Wilson (Feb 1964). "Mining Frontiers as a Measure of Western Historical Writing". Pacific Historical Review. 33 (1). University of California Press: 25–34. doi:10.2307/3636376. JSTOR 3636376.
- Paul, Rodman W. (Dec 1967). "The Mormons As a Theme in Western Historical Writing". The Journal of American History. 54 (3). Organization of American Historians: 511–523. doi:10.2307/2937404. JSTOR 2937404.
- Paul, Rodman W. (Apr 1969). "The New Western History: A Review of Two Recent Examples". Agricultural History. 43 (2). Agricultural History Society: 297–300. JSTOR 4617668.
- Paul, Rodman W. (Aug 1975). "Historical Advisory Committees: NASA and the National Archives". Pacific Historical Review. 44 (3). University of California Press: 385–394. doi:10.2307/3638034. JSTOR 3638034.
- Paul, Rodman W. (Apr 1978). "Frederick Merk, Teacher and Scholar: A Tribute". The Western Historical Quarterly. 9 (2). Utah State University: 141–148. doi:10.1093/whq/9.2.141. JSTOR 966823.
- Paul, Rodman W. (Jan 1979). "A Tenderfoot Discovers There Once Was a Mining West". The Western Historical Quarterly. 10 (1). Utah State University: 4–20. doi:10.2307/967129. JSTOR 967129.
- Paul, Rodman W. (Feb 1982). "After the Gold Rush: San Francisco and Portland". Pacific Historical Review. 51 (1). University of California Press: 1–21. doi:10.2307/3639818. JSTOR 3639818.
- Paul, Rodman W.; Malone, Michael P. (Jan 1985). "Tradition and Challenge in Western Historiography". The Western Historical Quarterly. 16 (1). Utah State University: 27–53. doi:10.2307/968156. JSTOR 968156.

== Sources ==
- "Rodman W. Paul, 74; Western Historian Taught at Caltech". Los Angeles Times. May 21, 1987.
- "Finding Aid for the Rodman W. Paul Papers 1929-1986". Online Archive of California.
- Paul, Rodman (1982). "Rodman W. Paul (1912-1987)" (PDF) (Interview). Interviewed by Carol Bugé. Pasadena, CA.
- "Mining History Association Awards". Mining History Association.
