= David Bushnell (historian) =

- Born: May 14, 1923; Philadelphia, Pennsylvania, U.S.
- Died: September 3, 2010 (aged 87); Miami, Florida, U.S.

Academic background
- Education: Harvard University

Academic work
- Discipline: History
- Sub-discipline: History of Colombia
- Institutions: University of Florida; University of Delaware

David Bushnell (May 14, 1923 – September 3, 2010) was an American academic and Latin American historian who has been called "The Father of the Colombianists." Bushnell, one of the first Americans to study Colombia, was considered one of the world's leading experts on the history of Colombia. He regarded it as one of the least studied countries in Latin America by academic scholars in the United States and Europe, and was considered the first American historian to study and introduce Colombian history as an academic field in the United States.

== Early life and career ==
Bushnell was born on May 14, 1923, in Philadelphia, Pennsylvania. He obtained a Bachelor of Arts degree from Harvard University. After graduation, Bushnell worked for both the Latin American Division of the Office of Strategic Services and the United States State Department from 1944 to 1946.

From 1956 to 1963, Bushnell worked as a United States Air Force historian based in Washington, D.C., and New Mexico. He co-authored Space Biology for the U.S. Air Force, which chronicled high-altitude experiments which experts designed to launch people into outer space during the early years of the space program. He also oversaw the creation of an official written history of NASA and served on the NASA Historical Advisory Committee during this period.

Bushnell first visited Colombia as a doctoral student in 1948. He completed his doctorate at Harvard University in 1951 by writing his thesis on the government of Francisco de Paula Santander. Bushnell would ultimately become one of the world's foremost experts on the history of modern Colombia during his career.

Bushnell worked as a professor and academic at the University of Delaware and the University of Florida. He taught at the University of Florida from 1963, when he left the U.S. Air Force, until his retirement in 1991. He remained a professor emeritus at the University of Florida and co-founded the Friends of the University of Florida Center for Latin American Studies in March 2005. He also served as the editor-in-chief of the Hispanic American Historical Review from 1986 to 1991. In 1975 he served as chair of the Conference on Latin American History, the professional organization of Latin American historians affiliated with the American Historical Association.

Besides works on Colombian history, he co-authored with Neill W. Macaulay, Jr. The Emergence of Latin America in the Nineteenth Century (1988, 2nd: 1994, ISBN 0195084020).

== Colombia historian ==
In 1993, Bushnell published his most widely read work on Colombian history, "The Making of Modern Colombia: A Nation in Spite of Itself", which was published in Spanish and then translated into English. The book became mandatory reading for scholars and students of Colombian history and politics.

His other major works included The Santander Regime in Gran Colombia, The Emergence of Latin America, and Eduardo Santos and the good neighbor. His books dealt with such subjects as the Colombian electoral system during the 19th century and foreign relations during the government of former President Eduardo Santos, who ruled from 1938 to 1942. He published his last article, "Philatelic Feminism: The Portrayal of Women on Stamps of Argentina, Colombia, Cuba, and the United States", shortly before his death in 2010.

Bushnell made his last visit to Colombia in April 2010, where he took part in the Alfonso López Pumarejo Forum held at the Universidad Nacional de Colombia.

Bushnell died of cancer in Gainesville, FL on September 3, 2010, at age 87. He had been scheduled to receive an honorary degree from National University of Colombia on September 24, 2010, at the time of his death.
