= John Morton Blum =

American political historian (1921–2011)

- Born: April 29, 1921; New York City, U.S.
- Died: October 17, 2011 (aged 90); North Branford, Connecticut, U.S.
- Education: Harvard University
- Spouse: Pamela Zink Blum
- Children: 3
- Writing career
- Genre: Historical

John Morton Blum (/blʌm/; April 29, 1921 – October 17, 2011) was an American historian, active from 1948 to 1991. He was a specialist in 20th-century American political history, and was a senior advisor to Yale officials.

== Life and career ==
Blum was born in New York City, the son of Edna (LeVino) Blum, a confectioner, and Morton Gustave Blum, a businessman and inventor. He came from a Jewish household of limited means. In high school he met Harvard University administrator Henry Chauncey, who spotted his talent and arranged for him to spend his senior year at Phillips Academy. He went on to attend Harvard University on scholarships and campus jobs. Upon graduation in 1943, he was commissioned as an ensign in the United States Navy, serving in the Caribbean, the South West Pacific theatre of World War II, and Iwo Jima. In 1950 he returned to Harvard to write his PhD dissertation on "Tumulty and the Wilson Era" under the direction of Frederick Merk. Blum married Pamela Zink in 1946 and had three children. He taught at MIT from 1948 to 1957 before moving to Yale University in 1957. He retired in 1991.

=== Professor at Yale ===
Blum was on the history faculty at Yale for 34 years, where he taught and influenced thousands of students. One of them in his large lecture class was future U.S. President George W. Bush. Blum later admitted "I haven't the foggiest recollection of him", but Bush remembered and cited Blum's influence in his commencement speech at Yale in May 2001. Other prominent students of his include Professor Henry Louis Gates, who considered Blum to be his mentor, as well as Professor Laura Kalman (University of California, Santa Barbara), Professor Akhil Reed Amar, Steve Gillon, resident historian of the History Channel, Massachusetts Senator John Kerry, and Connecticut Senator Joseph Lieberman.

Blum was one of the "Big Three" in Yale's History Department along with C. Vann Woodward and Edmund Morgan, and served as chairman of the History Department in the late 1960s.

After his death, the John Morton Blum Fellowship in American History and Culture was established at Yale.

== Historian ==
=== Author ===
Blum is the author of several historical works, including Joseph Tumulty and the Wilson Era (1951) (about President Woodrow Wilson's private secretary Joseph Patrick Tumulty), The Republican Roosevelt (1954), V Was for Victory (1977) (about World War II), and Years of Discord: American Politics and Society, 1961–1974 (1992) (covering U.S. politics from the inauguration of U.S. President John F. Kennedy to the resignation of U.S. President Richard Nixon). He also published a mystery novel based on Yale, An Old Blue Corpse (2005). He also wrote a memoir, A Life with History (2004), detailing his years on the nation's top history faculty, where he witnessed the privileged mostly white WASP student body grow in diversity, describing it as "not a refuge from reality but an alternative reality".

Perhaps Blum's most widely read work was The National Experience: A History of the United States (1963), a university history textbook he edited and co-authored with William S. McFeely, Edmund S. Morgan, Arthur M. Schlesinger Jr. and Kenneth M. Stampp.

His 1954 book The Republican Roosevelt restored the reputation of U.S. President Theodore Roosevelt, rescuing it from Henry F. Pringle's Pulitzer Prize-winning 1931 biography Theodore Roosevelt: A Biography, which portrayed him as a blustering politician who never grew up that kept him from being taken seriously. However Blum's prose came under attack: "In contrast to many biographers, Blum is not a natural writer; his style is neither elegant nor smooth. Instead, his sentences are often awkward and clunky and force the reader to sip rather than drink freely."

A specialist on the New Deal, Blum wrote From the Morgenthau Diaries (3 vols., 1959–1967), a biography closely based on the diaries of Henry Morgenthau Jr. (1891–1967), United States Treasury Secretary in 1934–1945. Blum was also prolific as an editor, serving as co-editor of The Letters of Theodore Roosevelt (8 vols., 1951–1954), edited by Elting E. Morison.

In 1980 Blum published Liberty, Justice, Order: Writings on Past Politics, 13 essays containing profiles of 10 political leaders representing the first seven decades of the 20th century, including Theodore Roosevelt, Herbert Croly, Mark Hanna, Woodrow Wilson, Franklin D. Roosevelt, Eleanor Roosevelt, Henry Wallace, Archibald MacLeish, Walter Lippman, and Earl Warren, bringing out their efforts to foster social justice and economic equality.

He also edited the letters of Walter Lippmann and Henry A. Wallace.

== Film and television ==
Blum made a cameo appearance as himself in the 1983 Woody Allen film Zelig, and he has appeared in various documentaries on PBS such as the American Experience series, including Theodore Roosevelt in 1996 with fellow historian David McCullough. In 1999 he appeared in "The Great War" segment of The Century: America's Time.

== Honors and awards ==
- American Academy of Arts and Sciences (1960)
- Pitt Professorship at Cambridge (1963–1964)
- Harold Vyvyan Harmsworth Professor of American History at Oxford University (1976–1977)
- Honorary Degree from Harvard University (1980)

== Works ==
- Joseph Tumulty and the Wilson Era (1951).
- The Republican Roosevelt (1954) read online
- The Letters of Theodore Roosevelt (8 vols.) (1954) (ed. with Elting E. Morison).
- From the Morgenthau Diaries (3 vols.) (1959–1967). "Years of Crisis, 1928–1938" (1959), "Years of Urgency, 1938–1941" (1965), "Years of War, 1941–1945" (1967).
- The National Experience: A History of the United States (with William S. McFeely, Edmund S. Morgan, Arthur M. Schlesinger Jr. and Kenneth M. Stampp) (1963)
- V Was for Victory: Politics and American Culture During World War II (1977) read online
- The Progressive Presidents: Roosevelt, Wilson, Roosevelt, Johnson (1980) online
- Liberty, Justice, Order: Writings on Past Politics (1980, 1993) read online
- Years of Discord: American Politics and Society, 1961–1974 (1992) online edition
- A Life with History (autobiography) (Harvard University Press, 2004)
