= Thomas P. Hughes (historian) =

American historian of technology

Thomas Parke Hughes (September 13, 1923 – February 3, 2014) was an American historian of technology. He was a professor of history at the University of Pennsylvania and a visiting professor at the Massachusetts Institute of Technology and Stanford.

He received his Ph.D. from the University of Virginia in 1953.

Hughes, along with John B. Rae, Carl W. Condit, and Melvin Kranzberg, were responsible for the establishment of the Society for the History of Technology and he was a recipient of its highest honor, the Leonardo da Vinci Medal in 1985.

He contributed to the concepts of technological momentum, technological determinism, large technical systems, social construction of technology, and introduced systems theory into the history of technology.

His book American Genesis was shortlisted for the Pulitzer Prize. He was elected to the American Philosophical Society in 2003.

== Main works ==
- Networks of Power: Electrification in Western Society, 1880-1930. Baltimore: Johns Hopkins University Press, 1983. ISBN 0-8018-4614-5.
- Edited with Wiebe E. Bijker and Trevor J. Pinch, eds. The Social Construction of Technological Systems: New Directions in the Sociology and History of Technology. Cambridge, MA: M.I.T. Press, 1987.
- Edited with Renate Mayntz. The Development of Large Technical Systems. Frankfurt am Main: Boulder, CO: Campus Verlag; Westview Press, 1988.
- American Genesis: A Century of Invention and Technological Enthusiasm, 1870-1970. New York, NY: Viking, 1989. Which was also a Pulitzer Prize finalist.
- Edited with Agatha C. Hughes. Lewis Mumford: Public Intellectual. New York: 1990.
- Rescuing Prometheus. 1st ed. New York: Pantheon Books, 1998.
- Human-Built World: How to Think About Technology and Culture. Chicago, IL: University of Chicago Press, 2004. ISBN 0-226-35933-6
