= Elting E. Morison =

American historian

Elting Elmore Morison (December 14, 1909, Milwaukee, Wisconsin – April 20, 1995, Peterborough, New Hampshire) was an American historian of technology, military biographer, author of nonfiction books, and essayist. He was an MIT professor and the founder of MIT's Science, Technology, and Society (STS) program.

== Biography ==
Morison, a grand-nephew of the engineer George S. Morison, was born in Milwaukee, Wisconsin. He studied at Harvard University, earning an BA degree in 1932 and an MA in 1934, returning in 1935–1937 as assistant dean. In 1935 he married Anne Hitchcock Sims, daughter of U.S. Admiral William Sims, whose biography he published in 1942 a few months after the Pearl Harbor Attack; it became the standard scholarly biography.

During World War II, Morison served in the U.S. Naval Reserve.

In 1944 he was awarded the John H. Dunning Prize for Admiral Sims and the Modern American Navy.

Morison first came to MIT in 1946 as an assistant professor of humanities in the Sloan School of Industrial Management.

In 1948 the Roosevelt Memorial Association hired Morison as director of the Theodore Roosevelt Research Project, which resulted in the 8-volume standard work The Letters of Theodore Roosevelt (1951–1954) (including his autobiography), of which he was the editor. Fellow MIT professor John Morton Blum was co-editor.

In 1966 Morison joined Yale University as a professor of history and American studies and in 1968 became master (now titled "head of college") of Timothy Dwight College.

In 1972 Morison rejoined MIT as the holder of the Killian Chair of the Humanities, playing a major role in conceiving and planning the interdisciplinary program that would later be known as Science, Technology, and Society (STS), which is designed to reveal the sweep of technological change as recorded in the history of science, technology, and industrial development, with an accent on the U.S., focusing on the interaction between scientific, technological, and social factors, work which he started in Men, Machines, and Modern Times.

In 1974 Morison published From Know-How to Nowhere: The Development of American Technology, "in which he tried to explain the development of American technology from 1800, when the nation was not able to build a 26-mile canal between the Charles and Merrimack Rivers in Massachusetts, to the late 1960s, when men flung themselves to the moon."

He died in 1995 in Peterborough, New Hampshire. He was survived by his second wife Elizabeth Forbes Tilghman Morison of Peterborough, a son, Nicholas G. Morison, two daughters, Mary Morison Nur and Sarah Morison Ford, a brother, John Morison of Lyndeborough, New Hampshire, and three grandchildren.

== Legacy ==
Morison's anecdote about organizational inertia is well known:

A time-motion expert was... called in to suggest ways to simplify the firing procedures. ...he noticed something that appeared odd to him. A moment before the firing two members of the gun crew ceased all activity and came to attention for a three-second interval, extending throughout the discharge of the gun. He summoned an old colonel of artillery, showed him the pictures, and pointed out this strange behaviour. What. he asked the colonel, did it mean? The colonel, too, was puzzled. He asked to see the pictures again. "Ah," he said when the performance was over. "I have it. They are holding the horses."
This story, true or not, and I am told it is true, suggests nicely the pain with which the human being accommodates himself to changing conditions.

Morison gives no source for the story. It is widely quoted and paraphrased in the management and organizational behavior literature, and has become a well-known parable, often epitomized as "holding the horses" and not directly attributed to Morison. Some retellings stray far from the original story.

== Professional organizations and affiliations ==
- Secretary of the Navy's Advisory Subcommittee on Naval History
- NASA Historical Advisory Committee

== Works ==
=== Author or co-author ===
- 1942 – Elting E. Morison – Admiral Sims and the Modern American Navy, New York: Houghton Mifflin Co. read online
- 1960 – Elting E. Morison – Turmoil and Tradition: A Study of the Life and Times of Henry L. Stimson, a biography of Henry L. Stimson, Secretary of State in the Hoover Administration, and later Secretary of War in the Roosevelt Administration, winner of the Parkman Prize of the Society of American Historians read online
- 1961 – Elting E. Morison – A Case Study of Innovation (pp. 592–605) in the collective volume The Planning of Change – Reading in the Applied Behavioral Sciences, edited by Warren G. Bennis (of Massachusetts Institute of Technology), Kenneth D. Benne, and Robert Chin (both from Boston University), and published by Holt, Rinehart and Winston, New York, 1961, Library of Congress Catalog Card Number 61-14602 20893–0111
- 1968 – Elting E. Morison – Men, Machines, and Modern Times read online
- 1974 – Elting E. Morison – From Know-How to Nowhere: The Development of American Technology
- 1976 – Elizabeth Forbes Morison and Elting E. Morison – New Hampshire: A Bicentennial History (W.W. Norton & Co.) read online online

=== Editor or co-editor ===
- The Letters of Theodore Roosevelt (8 vols.) (Harvard University Press, 1951–1954) "The Years of Preparation, 1868–1898" (1951), "The Years of Preparation: 1898–1900" (1951), "The Square Deal: 1901–1903" (1951), "The Square Deal: 1903–1905" (1951), "The Big Stick, 1905–1907" (1952), "The Big Stick, 1907–1909" (1952), "The Days of Armageddon, 1909–1914" (1954), "The Days of Armageddon, 1914–1919" (1954). read vol. 1 online
- 1958 – Elting E. Morison – The American Style: Essays in Value and Performance (Harper & Brothers)

== See also ==
- List of Yale University people
