= Technological momentum =

Technological momentum is a theory about the relationship between technology and society over time. The term, which is considered a fourth technological determinism variant, was originally developed by the historian of technology Thomas P. Hughes. The idea is that relationship between technology and society is reciprocal and time-dependent so that one does not determine the changes in the other but both influence each other.

== Theory ==
Hughes's thesis is a synthesis of two separate models for how technology and society interact. One, technological determinism, claims that society itself is modified by the introduction of a new technology in an irreversible and irreparable way—for example, the introduction of the automobile has influenced the manner in which American cities are designed, a change that can clearly be seen when comparing the pre-automobile cities on the East Coast to the post-automobile cities on the West Coast. Technology, under this model, self-propagates as well—there is no turning back once the adoption has taken place, and the very existence of the technology means that it will continue to exist in the future.

The other model, social determinism, claims that society itself controls how a technology is used and developed—for example, the rejection of nuclear power technology in the USA amid the public fears after the Three Mile Island incident.

Technological momentum takes the two models and adds time as the unifying factor. In Hughes's theory, when a technology is young, deliberate control over its use and scope is possible and enacted by society. However, as a technology matures, and becomes increasingly enmeshed in the society where it was created, its own deterministic force takes hold, achieving technological momentum in the process. According to Hughes this inertia, which is particularly the case for large technological systems with their technological and social components, makes them difficult to influence and steer as they start to go more on their own way, assuming deterministic traits in the process. In other words, Hughes's says that the relationship between technology and society always starts with a social determinism model, but evolves into a form of technological determinism over time and as its use becomes more prevalent and important.

Since its introduction by Hughes, the technological momentum concept has been applied by a number of other historians of technology. For instance, it is considered an effective approach to reconciling the apparently opposite perspectives of the autonomy of technology and the social and political motivations behind technological choices. It is able to describe how socially and politically conditioned technological institutions become independent and autonomous over time.
