= Politics of Nature =

1999 book by Bruno Latour

Politics of Nature: How to Bring the Sciences into Democracy
- Author: Bruno Latour
- Original title: Politiques de la nature
- Translator: Catherine Porter
- Language: English
- Subjects: Science and technology studies, political ecology
- Published: 1999 (Editions La Découverte) (French); 2004 (Harvard University Press) (English)
- Publication place: France, United States
- Pages: 307
- ISBN: 0-674-01289-5
- OCLC: 53145574
- LC Class: JA75.8.L3813 2004
- Preceded by: Aramis, or the Love of Technology
- Followed by: Pandora's Hope

Politics of Nature: How to Bring the Sciences Into Democracy is a book published in 2004 by French theorist and philosopher of science Bruno Latour. The book is an English translation by Catherine Porter of the original French work, Politiques de la nature.

== Overview ==
Latour argues for a new and better take on political ecology (not the discipline but the ecological political movements, e.g. greens) that embraces his feeling that, "political ecology has nothing to do with nature". In fact, Latour argues that the idea of nature is unfair because it unfairly allows those engaged in political discourse to "short-circuit" discussions. Latour uses Plato's metaphor of "the cave" to describe the current role of nature and science in separating facts from values which is the role of politics and non-scientists. Building on the arguments levelled in his previous works, Latour argues that this distinction between facts and values is rarely useful and in many situations dangerous. He claims that it leads to a system that ignores nature's socially constructed status and creates a political order without "due process of individual will".

Instead, he calls for a "new Constitution" where different individuals can assemble democratically without the definitions of facts and values influenced by current attitudes towards nature and scientific knowledge. Latour describes an alternate set of rules by which this assembly, or collective as he calls it, might come together and be constituted. He also describes the way that entities will be allowed in or out in the future. In describing this collective, Latour draws attention to the role of the spokesperson, who must be doubted but who must speak for otherwise mute things in order to ensure that the collective involves both "humans and non-humans". This is also an important aspect of Actor-network theory (ANT) that can be found in his main sociological works.

The book includes a short summary at the end and a glossary of terms.

== Reviews of the book ==
Sal Restivo emphasises that the book is reproducing the insights from Science Studies, which Bruno Latour himself greatly contributed to. However, Restivo questions whether Latour understood social constructivism and what sociologists actually do.

== See also ==
- Aramis, or the Love of Technology
- Laboratory life (with Steve Woolgar)
- Science in Action
- We Have Never Been Modern
