= Aramis, or the Love of Technology =

1994 book by Bruno Latour

- First edition (French)
- Author: Bruno Latour
- Original title: Aramis ou l'Amour des techniques
- Translator: Catherine Porter
- Language: English
- Publisher: La Découverte (France); Harvard University Press (US)
- Publication date: 1993
- Media type: Print (hardback)
- Pages: 336 (English translation)
- ISBN: 978-0-674-04323-7
- OCLC: 277985319

Aramis, or the Love of Technology was written by French sociologist/anthropologist Bruno Latour. Aramis was originally published in French in 1993; the English translation by Catherine Porter, copyrighted in 1996, ISBN 978-0-674-04323-7, is now in its fourth printing (2002). Latour describes his text as "scientifiction," which he describes as "a hybrid genre... for a hybrid task" (p. ix). The genre includes voices of a young engineer discussing his "sociotechnological initiation," his professor's commentary which introduces Actor-network theory (ANT), field documents - including real-life interviews, and the voice of Aramis—a failed technology.

The book is a quasi-mystery, which attempts to discover who killed Aramis. Aramis was supposed to be implemented as a Personal Rapid Transit (PRT) system in Paris. Simultaneously, while investigating Aramis's demise, Latour delineates the tenets of Actor-network theory. Latour argues that the technology failed not because any particular actor killed it, but because the actors failed to sustain it through negotiation and adaptation to a changing social situation.

== Table of contents ==
- Preface
- Prologue: Who Killed Aramis?
1. An Exciting Innovation
2. Is Aramis Feasible?
3. Shilly-Shallying in the Seventies
4. Interphase: Three Years of Grace
5. The 1984 Decision: Aramis Exists for Real
6. Aramis at the CET Stage: Will it Keep its Promise?
7. Aramis is Ready to Go (Away)
- Epilogue: Aramis Unloved
- Glossary

== See also ==
- Laboratory Life (with Steve Woolgar)
- Science in Action (book)
- Politics of Nature
- We Have Never Been Modern
