= Karin Knorr Cetina =

Austrian sociologist (born 1944)

- Born: July 19, 1944 (age 82); Graz, Austria
- Education: University of Vienna, (Cultural Anthropology, minor in Sociology), Ph.D., 1971; Institute for Advanced Studies, Vienna, Post-doctoral Diploma (Sociology), 1972; Bielefeld University, Habilitation (Sociology), 1981
- Occupations: Sociologist, professor
- Employer(s): Universität Konstanz, University of Chicago
- Known for: Work on epistemology and social constructionism
- Notable work: The Manufacture of Knowledge: An Essay on the Constructivist and Contextual Nature of Science (1981) and Epistemic Cultures: How the Sciences Make Knowledge (1999)
- Awards: Ford Fellow, Institute for the Study of Social Change, University of California, Berkeley

Karin Knorr Cetina (also Karin Knorr-Cetina) (born 19 July 1944 in Graz, Austria) is an Austrian sociologist well known for her work on epistemology and social constructionism, summarized in the books The Manufacture of Knowledge: An Essay on the Constructivist and Contextual Nature of Science (1981) and Epistemic Cultures: How the Sciences Make Knowledge (1999). Currently, she focuses on the study of global microstructures and Social studies of finance. Knorr Cetina is the Otto Borchert Distinguished Service Professor (Jointly Appointed in Anthropology) and chair of the Department of Sociology at the University of Chicago.

A knowledge object is a theoretical concept introduced by Knorr Cetina to describe the emergence of post-social relations in epistemic cultures. Knowledge objects are different from everyday things and are defined as unfolding structures that are non-identical with themselves; Jyri Engeström based the concept of social objects on this concept.

== Education and career ==
Knorr-Cetina studied at the University of Vienna, receiving a Ph.D. in cultural anthropology (with a minor in sociology) in 1971. Her dissertation research focused on the structural analysis of oral literature. She shifted her focus toward sociology as she found that cultural anthropology at the time was too focused on historical concerns, while she was more interested in contemporary social phenomena. Following the completion of her doctorate, Knorr-Cetina went to the Institute for Advanced Studies in Vienna, where many influential sociologists were invited to give presentations. This resulted in a Post-doctoral diploma in sociology, and an appointment as an instructor in anthropology at the University of Vienna from 1972 to 1973, and then in sociology from 1973 to 1976. During this time, Knorr-Cetina engaged in her first empirical investigations of science leading the 1975 publication (with Hermann Strasser and Hans Georg Zilian) Determinants and Controls of Scientific Development. It was also during these years that she first encountered the work of the ethnomethodologically inclined sociologist Aaron Cicourel, specifically "Method and measurement in sociology."

From 1976 to 1977, Knorr-Cetina received a Ford Foundation Fellowship to study at the Institute for the Study of Social Change at the University of California, Berkeley. Shortly before her arrival in California, the French philosopher-turned-sociologist Bruno Latour and British sociologist Steven Woolgar began their well known "laboratory studies" at the Salk Institute in southern California. Korr-Cetina's work at Berkeley ultimately contributed to this network of laboratory studies in the late 1970s, which would eventually become the field of the Social Studies of Science and Technology. The empirical research conducted while at Berkeley also became her widely cited 1981 publication The Manufacture of Knowledge: An Essay on the Constructivist and Contextual Nature of Science. Knorr-Cetina also received her Habilitation in sociology at Bielefeld University in 1981, and served as Professor of Sociology at Bielefeld from 1983 to 2001. Her work in the social studies of science during these years culminated in her widely cited book Epistemic Cultures: How the Sciences Make Knowledge, published in 1999.

Knorr-Cetina's progression to understanding how technology mediates sociality led her to select global financial markets as a new "laboratory" to study knowledge in society. The first suggestion of this new field site was in the article "Sociality with objects: Social relations in postsocial knowledge societies" (1997), followed later by a conference on "The Status of the Object in Social Science" at Brunel University in September 1999. The paper she presented at this conference, entitled "The Market as an Object of Attachment: Exploring Postsocial Relations in Financial Markets", was later published in 2000. Her co-author was Urs Bruegger, a former foreign exchange dealer. The two collaborated on over a dozen articles on global financial markets.

== Sociology of global financial systems ==
With the turn of the century, Knorr Cetina became interested in global financial markets as an object of study. From early work with Urs Bruegger, we see this developing into a strong research interest. This work is enhanced by the application of tools from science studies and the sociology of knowledge, for example, imagining "the market" as an object of attachment for traders or using market infrastructure (e.g. Bloomberg terminals) to see the microconstruction of the global market in the space of the local. The financial market infrastructure also comprises a "global scopic system" that integrates news and information across the world.

== The Synthetic Situation: Interactionism for a Global World ==
Knorr Cetina's lecture "The Synthetic Situation: Interactionism for a Global World" from 2008 is vital in rethinking past assumptions about communication and interaction order previously published by sociologists, namely Erving Goffman. In the lecture, which was eventually published in 2009, Knorr Cetina introduces and explains new concepts regarding global interaction. Although Goffman is widely published and read in these areas, much has changed since his day and Knorr Cetina conceptualized such changes.

The introduction of the "synthetic situation" is arguably one of her most important new concepts. It is defined as a situation that "invariably includes, and may in fact be entirely constituted by, on-screen projections". A synthetic situation, therefore, can manifest in many ways, both informal and formal. Examples include an online video chat, playing video games against others on the Internet or even a business deal done via videoconference. This idea can be seen as a result of the advancement in technology in recent years, and adds a new dimension to Goffman's social situation where face-to-face interaction is required. Knorr Cetina explains the difference of the two situations by the use of surgery. A Goffmanian situation occurs when there is just the surgeon and the patient. A synthetic situation arises, however, when the surgeon uses technology like a scope and a screen in order to accomplish the task at hand. Without looking at the patient through the screen, the job would not be able to be done and would remain a face-to-face, social situation.

== Awards and recognition ==
- 2009 John Desmond Bernal Prize from the Society for Social Studies of Science.
- Honorary Doctorate from the University of Lucerne 2005.

== Selected bibliography ==
=== Books ===
- Knorr-Cetina, Karin (1981). The manufacture of knowledge: an essay on the constructivist and contextual nature of science. Oxford New York: Pergamon Press. ISBN 9780080257778.
- Knorr-Cetina, Karin; Mulkay, Michael (1983). Science observed: perspectives on the social study of science. London Beverly Hills: Sage Publications. ISBN 9780803997837.
- Knorr Cetina, Karin (1999). Epistemic cultures: how the sciences make knowledge. Cambridge, Massachusetts: Harvard University Press. ISBN 9780674258945.
- Knorr Cetina, K., & Preda, A. (2004). The sociology of financial markets. Oxford University Press.
- Cetina, K. K., & Preda, A. (2012). The Oxford handbook of the sociology of finance. Oxford University Press on Demand.

=== Chapters in books ===
- Knorr Cetina, Karin (1992), "The couch, the cathedral, and the laboratory: on the relationship between experiment and laboratory in science", in Pickering, Andrew (ed.), Science as practice and culture, Chicago: University of Chicago Press, pp. 113–138, ISBN 9780226668017.

=== Journal articles ===
- Knorr Cetina, K. (1997). Sociality with objects: social relations in postsocial knowledge societies. Theory, culture & society, 14(4), 1-30.
- Knorr Cetina, K., & Brugger, U. (2002). Traders' Engagement with Markets: A Postsocial Relationship. Theory Culture Society, 19(5–6), 161–185.
