= Steven Yearley =

British sociologist

Steven Yearley FRSE
- Born: 6 September 1956 (age 70); Walthamstow, London, England

Academic background
- Education: University of Cambridge; University of York
- Doctoral advisor: Michael Mulkay

Academic work
- Discipline: Sociology
- Sub-discipline: Sociology of scientific knowledge
- Institutions: Queen's University Belfast; University of Ulster; University of York; University of Edinburgh

Steve Yearley FRSE (born 6 September 1956) is a British sociologist. He is Professor of the Sociology of Scientific Knowledge at the University of Edinburgh, a post he has held since 2005. He has been designated a Fellow of the Royal Society of Edinburgh. He is currently Director of the Institute for Advanced Studies in the Humanities.

== Career ==
Yearley was educated at Sir George Monoux Grammar School, Walthamstow, and studied natural sciences and then social and political sciences at Emmanuel College, Cambridge. He completed a PhD in sociology, supervised by Michael Mulkay, at the University of York from 1978 to 1981. H began to concentrate on environmental issues in 1983 while at Queen's University Belfast and was closely associated with Friends of the Earth, the Ulster Wildlife Trust and Northern Ireland Environment Link.

He became the first Professor of Sociology at the University of Ulster in 1992.

In 2006, Yearley became director of the Genomics Forum, a research institute funded by the ESRC. At the Forum, he focused primarily on environmental aspects, such as issues regarding synthetic biology, and on new ventures in public engagement with the science and technologies of genomics.

In 2010, Yearley was elected Fellow of the Royal Society of Edinburgh.

Yearley is on the editorial boards of the journals Social Studies of Science and Nature and Culture, and he co-edited The SAGE Dictionary of Sociology.

== Books ==
- Yearley, Steven (1984). Science and sociological practice. Milton Keynes: Open University Press. ISBN 9780335105816.
- Yearley, Steven (1988). Science, technology, and social change. London Boston: Unwin Hyman. ISBN 9780043012598.
- Yearley, Steven; Varcoe, Ian; McNeil, Maureen (1990). Deciphering science and technology: the social relations of expertise. Houndmills, Basingstoke, Hampshire: Macmillan. ISBN 9780333465554.
- Yearley, Steven; Varcoe, Ian; McNeil, Maureen (1990). The new reproductive technologies. New York: St. Martin's Press. ISBN 9780312035990.
- Yearley, Steven (1992). The green case: a sociology of environmental issues, arguments and politics. London New York: Routledge. ISBN 9780415083812.
- Yearley, Steven; Baker, Susan; Milton, Kay (1994). Protecting the periphery: environmental policy in peripheral regions of the European Union. Ilford: Frank Cass. ISBN 9780714645841.
- Yearley, Steven (1996). Sociology, environmentalism, globalization reinventing the globe. London Thousand Oaks California: Sage. ISBN 9780803975170.
- Yearley, Steven (2005). Making sense of science: understanding the social study of science. London: Sage. ISBN 9781412933896.
- Yearley, Steven (2005). Cultures of environmentalism: empirical studies in environmental sociology. Houndmills, Basingstoke, Hampshire New York: Palgrave Macmillan. ISBN 9781403901200.
