= Michael Lynch (ethnomethodologist) =

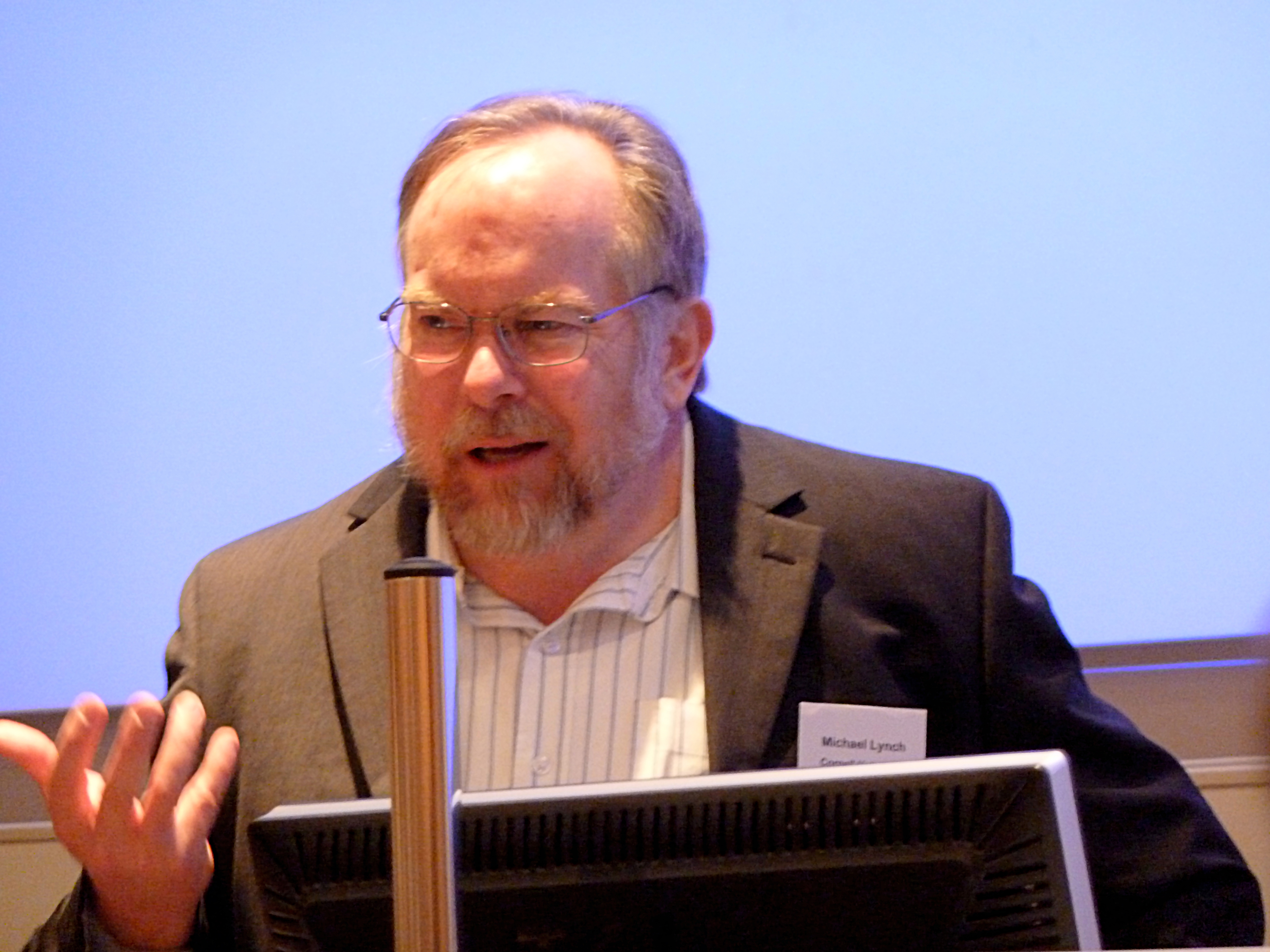
- Born: Michael E. Lynch; 17 October 1948 (age 78)

Academic background
- Education: University of California, Irvine (PhD)
- Influences: Harold Garfinkel

Academic work
- Main interests: Ethnomethodological approaches in science studies

Michael E. Lynch (born 17 October 1948), is an emeritus professor at the department of Science and Technology Studies at Cornell University. His works are particularly concerned with ethnomethodological approaches in science studies. Much of his research has addressed the role of visual representation in scientific practice.

From 2002 to 2012 he was the editor of Social Studies of Science. In 2016, he won the Society for Social Studies of Science's J. D. Bernal Prize for distinguished contributions to the field.

== Awards ==
- 1995 Robert K. Merton Professional award, Science, Knowledge and Technology Section of the American Sociological Association
- 2011 Distinguished Publication Award, Ethnomethodology/Conversation Analysis Section of the American Sociological Association
- 2016 John Desmond Bernal Prize
- 2020 Garfinkel-Sacks Award for Distinguished Scholarship, Ethnomethodology/Conversation Analysis Section of the American Sociological Association

== Selected bibliography ==
=== Books ===
- Lynch, Michael (1985). Art and artifact in laboratory science: a study of shop work and shop talk in a research laboratory. London Boston: Routledge & Kegan Paul. ISBN 9780710097538.
- Lynch, Michael; Woolgar, Steve (1990). Representation in scientific practice. Cambridge, Massachusetts: MIT Press. ISBN 9780262620765.
- Lynch, Michael (1993). Scientific practice and ordinary action: ethnomethodology and social studies of science. Cambridge England New York: Cambridge University Press. ISBN 9780521431521.
- Lynch, Michael; Sharrock, Wes (2003). Harold Garfinkel (4 volume set). London Thousand Oaks, California: SAGE. ISBN 9780761974598.
- Lynch, Michael; Wajcman, Judy; Hackett, Edward J.; Amsterdamska, Olga (2008). The handbook of science and technology studies (3rd ed.). Cambridge, Massachusetts: MIT Press Published in cooperation with the Society for the Social Studies of Science. ISBN 9781435605046.
- Lynch, Michael; Cole, Simon; McNally, Ruth; Jordan, Kathleen (2008). Truth machine the contentious history of DNA fingerprinting. Chicago: University of Chicago Press. ISBN 9780226498089.
- Lynch, Michael; Sharrock, Wes (2011). Ethnomethodology (4 volume set). Benchmarks in Research Methods. Los Angeles: Sage. ISBN 9781848604414.
- Lynch, Michael (2012). Science and technology studies: critical concepts in the social sciences (4 volume set). Oxon New York: Routledge. ISBN 9780415581820.
- Lynch, Michael; Woolgar, Steve; Coopmans, Catelijne; Vertesi, Janet (2014). Representation in scientific practice revisited. Cambridge, Massachusetts: MIT Press. ISBN 9780262525381.

=== Book chapters ===
- Lynch, Michael (1992), "Extending Wittgensteinian: the pivotal move from epistemology to the sociology of science", in Pickering, Andrew (ed.), Science as practice and culture, Chicago: University of Chicago Press, pp. 215–265, ISBN 9780226668017.
- Lynch, Michael (1992), "From the "Will to Theory" to the Discursive Collage: A reply to Bloor's "Left and Right Wittgensteinians"", in Pickering, Andrew (ed.), Science as practice and culture, Chicago: University of Chicago Press, pp. 283–300, ISBN 9780226668017.

=== Journal articles ===
- Lynch, Michael; Garfinkel, Harold; Livingston, Eric (June 1981). "The work of a discovering science construed with materials from the optically discovered pulsar". Philosophy of the Social Sciences. 11 (2): 131–158. doi:10.1177/004839318101100202. S2CID 143072970.
- Lynch, Michael (April 1988). "The externalized retina: Selection and mathematization in the visual documentation of objects in the life sciences". Human Studies. 2–3 (11): 201–234. doi:10.1007/BF00177304. S2CID 59776975.
- Lynch, Michael; Woolgar, Steve (April 1988). "Introduction: Sociological orientations to representational practice in science". Human Studies. 2–3 (11): 99–116. doi:10.1007/BF00177300. S2CID 143536396.
- Lynch, Michael (Winter 1994). "Representation is overrated: some critical remarks about the use of the concept of representation in science studies". Configurations. 2 (1): 137–149. doi:10.1353/con.1994.0015.
- Lynch, Michael (August 2002). "From naturally occurring data to naturally organized ordinary activities: comment on Speer". Discourse Studies. 4 (4): 531–537. doi:10.1177/14614456020040040801. S2CID 144475763.
- Lynch, Michael (December 2006). "From Ruse to Farce". Social Studies of Science. 36 (6): 819–826. doi:10.1177/0306312706067897. S2CID 143851225.
- Lynch, Michael; Cody, Cyrus C.M. (September 2010). "Test objects and other epistemic things: a history of a nanoscale object". The British Journal for the History of Science. 43 (3): 423–458. doi:10.1017/S0007087409990689. S2CID 13342372.
- Lynch, Michael (February 2011). "Still emerging after all these years". Social Studies of Science. 41 (1): 3–4. doi:10.1177/0306312710396569. S2CID 146494689.
- Lynch, Michael (December 2011). "Editorial". Social Studies of Science. 41 (6): 767–768. doi:10.1177/0306312711427368. S2CID 220719334.
- Lynch, Michael (December 2011). "Ad hoc special section on ethnomethodological studies of science, mathematics, and technical activity: Introduction". Social Studies of Science. 41 (6): 835–837. doi:10.1177/0306312711427369. S2CID 147128507.
- Lynch, Michael (December 2011). "Harold Garfinkel (29 October 1917 – 21 April 2011): A remembrance and reminder". Social Studies of Science. 41 (6): 927–942. doi:10.1177/0306312711423434. S2CID 144144921.
- Lynch, Michael (March 2013). "Science, truth, and forensic cultures: The exceptional legal status of DNA evidence". Studies in History and Philosophy of Science Part C. 44 (1): 60–70. doi:10.1016/j.shpsc.2012.09.008. PMID 23117027.
