= Roy MacLeod =

American-born historian (born 1941)

Professor Roy MacLeod OAM FSA FRHistS FAHA FASSA FRSN
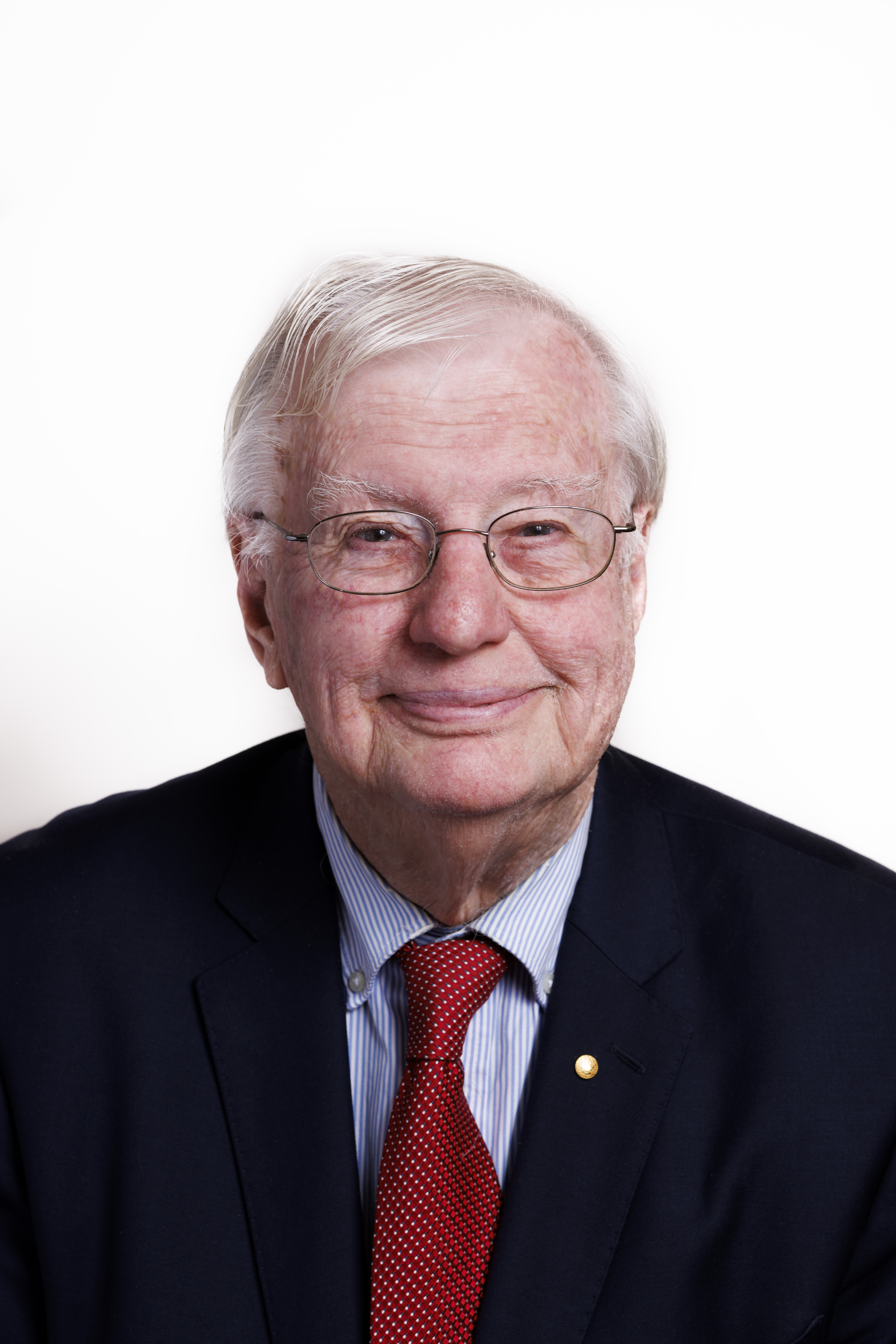
- Born: Roy Malcolm MacLeod; 1941 (84–85 years old); United States
- Occupation: Historian
- Title: Emeritus Professor
- Spouses: Dr Kimberley Webber (m. 1996); Kay Andrews, Baroness Andrews (m. 1970–1991)
- Children: 1 (m)
- Awards: Medal of the Order of Australia (2020); Humboldt Prize (2001); Centenary Medal (2001)

Academic background
- Education: University of Cambridge; Harvard University

Academic work
- Discipline: History; History and Philosophy of Science
- Sub-discipline: Social History of Science, Technology and Medicine
- Institutions: University of Sydney; University of London; University of Sussex; EHESS
- Website: University of Sydney profile

Roy Malcolm MacLeod (born 1941) is an American-born historian who has spent his career working in the United Kingdom and Australia. He is a specialist in the history and social studies of science and knowledge.

== Early life ==
Roy MacLeod studied history and biochemistry at Harvard University and was awarded the AB degree summa cum laude.

From 1963 to 1966 he studied history and the history of science at Cambridge University as a Fulbright Scholar, and was awarded the PhD in history in 1967.

== Career ==
MacLeod was appointed to the first Junior Research Fellowship in History at Churchill College, Cambridge in 1966, a position he held until 1970. Whilst at Cambridge, he was invited to a visiting chair in Victorian Studies at Indiana University in Bloomington, where he introduced students to Darwinian studies and the history of the scientific movement in 19th century England. In 1966, following an invitation from Asa Briggs, he was appointed a Research Fellow in Social Sciences at the new University of Sussex, where he soon became a founding Fellow of the new Science Policy Research Unit (SPRU). In 1970, he was appointed foundation Reader in the History and Philosophy of Science at Sussex, where he established a new subject group in the History and Social Studies of Science (HSSS).

In 1971, MacLeod launched at HSSS one of the first graduate degrees in 'Science Studies' in England, which, by 1979, had graduated over 100 students - and co-founded the academic journal Social Studies of Science, which focused on the history, politics and sociology of science and technology, and is today among the most cited journals in the field. MacLeod served as co-editor, with David Edge of Edinburgh, for the next 21 years, standing down in 1992.

Also in 1971, he was appointed a Directeur d'Etudes Associé at the École des Hautes Ḗtudes en Sciences Sociales in Paris, and, with Gerard Lemaine, and Clemens Heller, worked at the Maison des Sciences de l'Homme. There, he co-founded Project PAREX (Paris-Sussex) for the collaborative study of the history and sociology of science in Europe. In 1973–74, he served as a visiting professor of Science and Society at the Free University in Amsterdam, and established a network of scholars that, by the 1980s, helped to form the European Association for the Study of Science and Technology. In 1976–77, MacLeod was a visiting fellow at the Charles Warren Center for studies in American History at Harvard University, where he wrote on the relation between science, the "research ideal", and the history of universities in America.

In 1978 MacLeod moved from the University of Sussex to the foundation chair of Science Education at the Institute of Education in the University of London where he introduced the history of science and higher degrees in Health Education and Environmental Education, and oversaw the introduction of classroom computers in secondary schools across London and the Southeast of England. In 1980, he was appointed a Fellow at the Woodrow Wilson Center in Washington, DC, where he wrote on military history and modern statecraft. He subsequently wrote extensively on the experience of science and scientists during and after the Great War, and on the effects of science on colonial expansion and globalisation.

In 1982, MacLeod was invited to Australia as professor of history at the University of Sydney, where he remained for the next 21 years. There he began new courses in imperial history and museum studies, established a Centre for Human Aspects of Science and Technology (CHAST), and contributed to the establishment of the university's Centre for Peace and Conflict Studies (CPAC), its Research Institute on Asia and the Pacific (RIAP), and its Centre for International Security Studies (CISS).

Whilst at Sydney, MacLeod also taught undergraduate, honours and master's courses in social, economic, and cultural history; Australian and Commonwealth history; medical history; military history; nuclear history; the history of higher education; and the history of science and technology in Europe, India, Asia, Australia, and the Pacific.

In 1985, with Philip Rehbock, he co-founded the Pacific Circle, a scientific commission of the International Union of the History and Philosophy of Science, and launched the Pacific Circle Bulletin, based in Honolulu, as a means of encouraging research in the history of the natural and social sciences across the Ocean and around the Rim.

In 2000 working from Sydney, MacLeod became editor-in-chief of the academic journal Minerva: A Review of Science, Learning and Policy, and served in that position until 2008. In this role, he broadened the scope and compass of the journal to embrace the new field of ‘Science and Technology Studies’ (STS) and to reach a global readership.

In 2003, following his formal retirement from the University of Sydney, he was appointed emeritus professor of history, and he has remained in the School of Philosophical and Historical Inquiry (SOPHI). He is also an honorary professor at the university's Centre for International Security Studies, an honorary associate in the School of History and Philosophy of Science, and an honorary member of the Sydney Nano Institute.

MacLeod has held a number of visiting positions ― at Indiana, Harvard, UC Santa Cruz, UBC, Stockholm, Bolongna, Florence, Paris, Oxford and Cambridge. In 2010, he held the Charles A. Lindbergh Chair in Aerospace History at the National Air and Space Museum (part of the Smithsonian Institution) in Washington D.C.. In 2011 and again in 2012, he was a Fellow of the Lichtenberg Kolleg of the University of Göttingen. He held the Keeley Visiting Fellowship at Wadham College, Oxford in 2013, and a Wellcome Trust Fellowship at the London School of Hygiene and Tropical Medicine in 2017. He has also been a visiting senior fellow at Magdalen College, Oxford and St John's College, Oxford, and a Fowler Hamilton Fellow at Christ Church, Oxford. In 2001, he was awarded a Research Prize by the Alexander von Humboldt Foundation, which took him to the University of Heidelberg, and in 2017 he was a Humboldt Alumni Fellow at the University of Hamburg and the Karlsruhe Institute of Technology.

In 2021, under the auspices of the Academy of the Social Sciences in Australia, MacLeod co-convened and presented a nine-part webinar series on 'Australia's Future in Space: Making SPACE for the Social Sciences'.

== Distinctions and awards ==
Roy MacLeod is a Fellow of the Society of Antiquaries of London, the Royal Historical Society, the Academy of the Social Sciences in Australia, the Australian Academy of the Humanities, the International Academy of the History of Science, and the Royal Society of New South Wales. He has twice been a Fellow at the Chemical Heritage Foundation in the United States (now the Science History Institute).

In 2001 he was awarded the Doctor of Letters degree by Cambridge University. In the same year he was awarded a Centenary Medal for services to History by the Australian government.

In 2005, for services to the Faculty of Letters, he received a doctorate of letters, honoris causa from the University of Bologna.

MacLeod received the Sarton Medal as Sarton Chair of History of Science, Faculty of Political and Social Sciences, Ghent University, Belgium between 2014 and 2015 In 2017, he received the History of Philosophy and Science Medal from the Royal Society of New South Wales.

In the 2020 Queen's Birthday Honours, he was awarded the Medal of the Order of Australia for services to education, particularly to history. In 2022, in recognition of his life-time contributions to teaching and research, the University of Sussex conferred upon him the honorary degree of Doctor of the University. In 2023, he was appointed a Fellow of the International Science Council.

== Select Bibliography ==
Some of his books and more than 140 articles include:

=== Books Authored ===
- Treasury Control and Social Administration: Establishment Growth and the Local Government Board, 1871-1905 (1968)
- John Tyndall, Natural Philosopher, 1820-1893: A Catalogue of Correspondence/Journals and Collected Papers (1974)
- The Wellsprings of English Science: The Corresponding Societies of the British Association for the Advancement of Science, 1880-1920 (1974)
- Public Science and Public Policy in Victorian England (1996)
- The Creed of Science in Victorian England (2000)
- Archibald Liverside, FRS: Imperial Science under the Southern Cross (2009)

=== Books Co-authored ===
- Archives of British Men of Science (with Friday, J.) (1973)
- Perspectives on the Emergence of Scientific Disciplines (with Lemaine, G., Mulkay, M., Weingart, P.) (1976)
- Natural Knowledge in Social Context: The Journals of Thomas Archer Hirst FRS (with Brock, W.) (1980)

=== Books Edited or Co-edited ===
- Perspectives on the Emergence of Scientific Disciplines (1976)
- The Parliament of Science: the British Association for the Advancement of Science 1831-1981 (1981)
- Days of Judgement: Science, Examinations, and the Organization of Knowledge in Late Victorian England (1982)
- The Government of Victorian London, 1855-1889: The Metropolitan Board of Works, the Vestries, and the City Corporation (1982)
- Technology and the Human Prospect (1986)
- Disease, Medicine and Empire: Perspectives on Western Medicine and the Experience of European Expansion (1988)
- Government and Expertise: Specialists, Administrators and Professionals, 1860-1919 (1988)
- The Commonwealth of Science: ANZAAS and the Scientific Enterprise in Australasia, 1888-1988 (1988)
- University and Community in Nineteenth Century Sydney: Professor John Smith and Science in the Colonial Metropolis, 1821-1885 (1988)
- Nature in its Greatest Extent: Western Science in the Pacific (1988)
- Health and Healing in Tropical Australia and Papua New Guinea (1991)
- Darwin's Laboratory: Evolutionary Theory and Natural History in the Pacific (1994)
- The Library of Alexandria: Centre of Learning in the Ancient World (1999)
- Science and the Pacific War: Science and Survival in the Pacific, 1939-1945 (2000)
- Frontline and Factory: Comparative Perspectives on the Chemical Industry at War, 1914-1924 (2006)
- For Science, King & Country: The Life and Legacy of Henry Moseley (2018)

=== Selected articles ===
- 'The Alkali Acts Administration, 1863-84: The Emergence of the Civil Scientist,' Victorian Studies, IX (2), (Dec.1965), 85–112.
- 'Evolutionism and Richard Owen 1830-1868: An Episode in Darwin's Century,' Isis, 56 (185), (Fall, 1965), 259–280.
- 'Law, Medicine and Public Opinion: The Resistance to Compulsory Health Legislation, 1870–1907,' Public Law (Summer, 1967), 107–128; (Autumn, 1967), 189–211.
- 'The Edge of Hope: Social Policy and Chronic Alcoholism, 1870–1900,' Journal of the History of Medicine and Allied Sciences, XXII (3), (1967), 215–245.
- 'The Committee of Civil Research: Scientific Advice for Economic Development, 1925–1930,' Minerva, VII (4), (1969), 680-705 (with E.K. Andrews).
- 'The Genesis of Nature,' Nature, 224 (5218), (1 Nov. 1969) [Centenary Issue], 423–440.
- 'The Social Framework of Nature in its First Fifty Years,' Nature, 224 (5218), (1 November 1969), 441–446.
- 'The X-Club: A Scientific Network in Late-Victorian England,' Notes and Records of the Royal Society, 24 (2), (1970), 305–322.
- 'Scientific Advice on the War at Sea, 1915-1917: The Board of Invention and Research,' Journal of Contemporary History, 6 (2), (1971), 3-40 (with E.K. Andrews).
- 'The Resources of Science in Victorian England,' in Peter Mathias (ed.), Science and Society (Cambridge: Cambridge University Press, 1972), 111-166 (with E.K. MacLeod).
- 'War and Economic Development: Government and the Optical Industry in Britain, 1914–18,' in Jay M. Winter (ed.), War and Economic Development: Essays in Honour of David Joslin (Cambridge: Cambridge University Press, 1975), 165–204.
- 'Scientific Advice for British India: Imperial Perceptions and Administrative Goals, 1898–1923,' Modern Asian Studies, 9 (3), (1975), 343–384.
- 'Science and the Treasury: Principles, Personalities and Policies, 1870–1885,' in G.L'.E. Turner (ed.), The Patronage of Science in the Nineteenth Century (Leyden: Noordhoff International Publishing, 1976), 115–172.
- 'John Tyndall,' Dictionary of Scientific Biography (New York: Scribners, 1976), XIII, 521–524.
- 'The Social Relations of Science and Technology, 1914-1939,' in Carlo Cipolla (ed.), The Fontana Economic History of Europe: Vol. 5: The Twentieth Century, Part I (London: Collins/Fontana, 1976), 301-335 (with Kay MacLeod).
- 'Changing Perspectives in the Social History of Science,' in Ina Spiegel-Rösing and Derek de Solla Price (eds), Science, Technology and Society: A Cross-Disciplinary Perspective (London: Sage, 1977), 149–195.
- 'On Visiting the 'Moving Metropolis': Reflections on the Architecture of Imperial Science,' Historical Records of Australian Science, 5 (3), (1982), 1–16; reprinted in Nathan Reingold and Marc Rothenberg (eds), Scientific Colonialism: A Cross-Cultural Comparison (Washington, DC: Smithsonian Institution Press, 1987); 217–249; subsequently reprinted as 'De Visita a la 'Moving Metropolis': Reflexiones sobre la Arquitectura de la Ciencia Imperial,' in Antonio Lafuente and Juan-José Saldana (eds), Historia de las Ciencias: Nuevas Tendencias (Madrid: Consejo Superior de Investigaciones Cientificas, 1987), 217–240; and in William K. Storey (ed.), Scientific Aspects of European Expansion (London: Variorum, 1996), 23–55.
- 'A Workingman's Paradise? Reflections on Urban Mortality in Colonial Australia, 1860–1900,' Medical History, 31 (4), (1987), 387-402 (with M. Lewis).
- 'Gold from the Sea: Archibald Liversidge, FRS, and the "Chemical Prospectors," 1870–1970,' Ambix: The Journal of the Society for the History of Alchemy and Chemistry, 35 (1988), 53–64.
- 'The Phantom Soldiers: Australian Tunnellers on the Western Front, 1916–1918,'Journal of the Australian War Memorial, No. 13 (1988), 31–43.
- 'The "Arsenal" in the Strand: Australian Chemists and the British Munitions Effort, 1916-19’, Annals of Science, 46 (1), (1989), 45–67.
- 'The "Practical Man": Myth and Metaphor in Anglo-Australian Science,' Australian Cultural History, No. 8, (1989), 24–49.
- 'Passages in Imperial Science: From Empire to Commonwealth,' in Shula Marks (ed.), Transfer and Transformation: Professional Institutions in the Commonwealth: Essays on the Fortieth Anniversary of the Institute of Commonwealth Studies (London: University of London, 1990), 28–52.
- ‘The Contradictions of Progress: The History of Science and the Discourse of Development,’ Prometheus, 10 (2), (1992), 260–285.
- 'Doctors’ Dilemmas: Managing Research Degrees and Government Policy in Anglo-Australian Perspective', Annual Report of the Academy of the Social Sciences in Australia, 1992, 44–53.
- 'The Chemists Go to War: The Mobilisation of Civilian Chemists and the British War Effort, 1914-1918', Annals of Science, 50 (1993), 455–481.
- 'Combat Scientists': The Office of Scientific Research and Development and Field Service in the Pacific,' War and Society, 11 (2), (October 1993), 117–134.
- '"All for Each and Each for All": Reflections on Commonwealth Scientific Cooperation, 1940–45,' Albion, 26 (1), (1994), 79–112; reprinted in Jeremy Black (ed.), The Second World War: Volume VII: Alliance Politics and Grand Strategy (Aldershot: Ashgate, 2007), 281–314.
- 'Nuclear Knights vs Nuclear Nightmares: Experts as Advocates and Emissaries in Australian Nuclear Affairs,' in Regis Cabral (ed.), Perspectives on Nuclear History (Göteborg: University of Göteborg, 1994), 97–112.
- 'The Atom Comes to Australia: Reflections on Australian Nuclear History, 1953–1993, 'History and Technology, 11 (3), (1994), 1–17.
- 'From Crystal Palace to "Clever Country:" Understanding Science Museums in Australia', Quadrant, XXXVIII (10), (October, 1994), 61–66.
- 'Science, Progressivism and "Efficient Imperialism"', in Roy MacLeod and Richard Jarrell (eds.), Dominions Apart: Reflections on the Culture of Science and Technology in Canada and Australia, 1850–1945, Scientia Canadensis, 17 (1,2), (1995), 8-25.
- 'Resistance to Nuclear Technologies: Optimists, Opportunists and Opposition in Australian Nuclear History', in Martin Bauer (ed.), Resistances to New Technology (Cambridge: Cambridge University Press, 1995), 165–188.
- 'Colonial Engineers and the "Cult of Practicality": Themes and Dimensions in the History of Australian Engineering', History and Technology, 12 (2), (1995), 69–84.
- ‘Kriegesgeologen and Practical Men’: Military Geology and Modern Memory 1914–1918', British Journal of the History of Science, 28 (4), (1995), 427–50.
- 'The Industrial Invasion of Britain': Mobilising Australian Munitions Workers, 1916-1919', Journal of the Australian War Memorial, No. 27, October 1995, 37–46.
- 'The Other ANZACs’: Australian Munitions Workers in the Great War', Voices (Canberra: National Library of Australia, 1995), 5 (4), (1995/6), 26–48.
- ''Maps, Landscapes, and Mentalités: Artistic and Geological Representations of the Australian Landscape in the Nineteenth Century', in Liselotte Jontes (ed.), Das Kulturelle Erbe in Den Montan-und Geowissenschaften Biliotheken-Archive-Museen (Wien: Verlag der Geologische Bundesanstalt, 1997), 139–146.
- ''Chemistry for King and Kaiser: Revisiting Chemical Enterprise and the European War', in Anthony Travis et al. (eds.), Determinants in the Evolution of the European Chemical Industry, 1900-1939: New Technology, Political Frameworks, Markets and Companies (Dordrecht: Kluwer, 1998), 25–49.
- 'Balfour's Mission: Science, Strategy, and Vision in the Inauguration of the Hebrew University', Studies in Contemporary Jewry, XIV (1998), 214–234.
- 'From Arsenal to Munitions Supply: Revisiting the Experience of the First World War', in Frank Cain (ed.), Arming the Nation: A History of Defence Science and Technology in Australia (Canberra: Australian Defence Studies Center, Australian Defence Force Academy, 1999), 11–21.
- 'Secrets among Friends: The Research Information Service and the 'Special Relationship' in Allied Scientific Information and Intelligence, 1916-18', Minerva, 37 (3), (1999), 201–233.
- 'The Boffins of Botany Bay: Revisiting Australia's Wartime Radar Program,' Historical Records of Australian Science, 12 (4), (1999), 411–419.
- 'Der Wissenschaftliche Internationalismus in der Krise: Die Akademien der Alliierten und ihr Reaktion auf den Ersten Weltkrieg', in Wolfram Fischer ed., with the assistance of R. Hohlfeld and P.Nötzoldt, Die Preussische Akademie der Wissenschaften zu Berlin, 1914-45 (Berlin: Akademie der Wissenschaften, 2000), 317–349.
- 'Strictly for the Birds: Science, the Military and the Smithsonian's Pacific Ocean Biological Program', Journal of the History of Biology, 34 (4), (2001), 315–352; reprinted in MacLeod and Garland Allen (eds.), Science, History and Social Concern: Essays in Honor of Everett Mendelsohn (Dordrecht: Kluwer, 2002), 307–338.
- ‘L’Entente Chimique: L’Echec de l’Avenir à le Fin de la Guerre, 1918-1922’, Le Sabre et L’Eprouvette: L’Invention d’une Science de Guerre, 1914/1939, l’Aujourd’hui, 6 (2003),135-153.
- ‘South Kensington comes to Sydney’, in Graeme Davison and Kimberley Webber (eds.), Yesterday's Tomorrows: The Powerhouse Museum and its Precursors, 1880-2005 (Sydney: Powerhouse Museum and University of New South Wales Press, 2005), 42–53.
- ‘The War the Victors Lost: The Dilemmas of Chemical Disarmament, 1919-1926, in R. MacLeod and J. Johnson (eds.), Frontline and Factory: Comparative Perspectives on the Chemical Industry at War, 1914-1924 (Dordrecht: Springer, 2006), 221-246 (with Jeffrey Johnson).
- ‘Discovery and Exploration’, in Peter J. Bowler and John V. Pickstone (eds.), The Cambridge History of Science, vol. 6: The Modern Biological and Earth Sciences (Cambridge: Cambridge University Press, 2009), 34–59.
- ‘The Royal Society and the Commonwealth: Old Friendships, New Frontiers’, Notes and Records of the Royal Society, 64 (Supplement 1), (2010), 137–149.
- ‘Science’, in Jay Winter (ed.) Cambridge History of the First World War (Cambridge: Cambridge University Press, 2014), vol.2, 434–459, 704–708.
- ‘The Great War and Modern Science: Lessons and Legacies’, Sartoniana, 28 (2015), 13–32; reprinted with additions: ‘The Great War and Modern Science: Lessons and Legacies’, in Marysa Demoor, Cedric van Dijck and Sarah Posman (eds.), Intellectuals and the Great War (Eastbourne: Sussex Academic Press, 2017), 270–284.
- ‘The World of Science, the Great War, and Beyond: Revisiting Max Weber’s Wissenschaft als Beruf’, in Marie-Eve Chignon and Tomás Irish (eds.), The Academic World in the Era of the Great War (London: Palgrave Macmillan, 2017), 253–270.
- ‘The Genie and the Bottle’: Post-war Preparedness and the Chemical Weapons Debate in the United States, 1918-1928’, in Bretislav Friedrich et al. (eds.), Gedenkveranstaltung 100 Jahr Giftgaskrieg: Forschung, Einsatz, Folgen Chemischer Massenvernichtungswaffen (Berlin: Fritz Haber Institut der Max-Planck Gesellschaft und Springer Verlag, 2017), 189–212.
- ‘The Mineral Sanction’: The Great War and the Strategic Role of Natural Resources’, in Richard Tucker, Tait Keller, J.R. McNeil, Martin Schmid (eds.), Environmental Histories of the First World War (New York: Cambridge University Press, 2018), 99–116.
- ‘Australia’s Future in Space: Making SPACE for the Social Sciences’, nine-part webinar series sponsored by the Academy of the Social Sciences in Australia.
- ‘A Tale of Two Cities: Cambridge and Chicago in the Cultural Cold War’(The 50th anniversary of Social Studies of Science, 4S and EASST, Toronto, 2021) (forthcoming).
