= Cognitive sociology =

Sociological study of cognitive processes and phenomena

Cognitive sociology is a sociological sub-discipline devoted to the study of the "conditions under which meaning is constituted through processes of reification." It does this by focusing on "the series of interpersonal processes that set up the conditions for phenomena to become “social objects,” which subsequently shape thinking and thought." Thus, this research aims to sort out the social and cultural contingencies and consequences of human cognition, alongside the role of society and culture in shaping cognition. It has its roots in classical sociological theory, notably Durkheim and Weber, and from contemporary sociological theory, notably Goffman and Bourdieu. Some of the more significant areas of inquiry for cognitive sociologists have included: knowledge, identity, belief, human consciousness, perception, faith, rationality, semiotics, ideology, prejudice, trust, logic, and normality.

Notable authors on such topics and more include, but are not limited to, Eviatar Zerubavel, Aaron Cicourel, Barry Schwartz, Karen A. Cerulo, and Paul DiMaggio.

== Disciplinary history ==
The term 'cognitive sociology' was used already in 1974 by Cicourel. However, in 1997 DiMaggio published what has been referred to as a now classic paper of how cognitive sociology overlaps with the sociology of culture & cognition. Michael W. Raphael provides an overview of cognitive sociology in its current form.

Special journal issues on the topic of Cognitive Sociology has been published by the scientific journals Poetics and the European Journal of Social Theory in 2010 and 2007 respectively.

Graduate-level courses in cognitive sociology has been organized at the University of Copenhagen by Jacob Strandell in 2014 and 2016

== Theoretical approaches ==
In order to organize this interdisciplinary investigation, scholars have articulated five models of the actor that stress different locations of human cognition in relation to the social contract. These models are:

1. Universal cognitivism stresses "naturalistic explanations of human behavior". This is reflected in the work of Stephen Park Turner, Omar Lizardo and Gabriel Ignatow.
2. Fuzzy universal cognitivism "emphasizes naturalism in the explanations, but its ontological positions are not as balanced as plural cognitivism". This is reflected in the work of Jürgen Habermas and Paul DiMaggio.
3. Plural cognitivism seeks to formulate a "balanced model of the actor subjected to socio-mental control. Socio-mental control describes how impersonal cognitive norms shape the thinking, learning, and courses of activity individual actors are able to undertake as a result of institutional reflexivity." Institutional reflexivity is a process described by Goffman in "The Arrangement between the Sexes". This is reflected in the work of Eviatar Zerubavel and his students.
4. Fuzzy individual cognitivism "emphasizes humanism in the explanations, but its ontological positions are not as balanced as plural cognitivism". This is reflected in the work of Luc Boltanski and Laurent Thévenot as well as Alban Bouvier.
5. Individual cognitivism investigates the "inner determinants of action with respect to the practical, cognitive, and moral properties of social facts." This is reflected in the work of Raymond Boudon and Patrick Pharo.
