= Michael Mulkay =

British sociologist (1936–2025)

Michael Joseph Mulkay
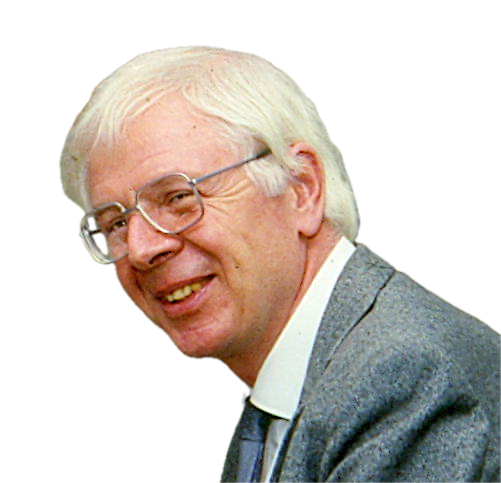
- Michael Mulkay
- Born: August 10, 1936; London, England
- Died: October 21, 2025 (aged 89)
- Education: London School of Economics (BSc); Simon Fraser University (MA); University of Aberdeen (PhD)
- Known for: discourse analysis of science; reflexivity; New Literary Forms
- Awards: John Desmond Bernal Prize (1986); Macleod Medal (2025)
- Scientific career
- Fields: Sociology; sociology of scientific knowledge; discourse analysis; reflexive sociology
- Workplaces: Simon Fraser University; University of Aberdeen; University of Cambridge; University of York
- Doctoral students: Nigel Gilbert, Steve Woolgar, Steve Yearley, Andrew Webster, Jonathan Potter

Michael Joseph Mulkay (10 August 1936 – 21 October 2025) was a British sociologist known for his contributions to the development of the sociology of scientific knowledge, discourse analysis, and reflexive sociology.

== Early life and education ==
Mulkay was born in London on 10 August 1936 to Joseph Mulkay, a window cleaner, and Annie Johnson, a housewife. After his mother left the family home in 1946, he was raised by his father in a council house in Tottenham. He attended a Catholic boys' school in North London, which he later recalled as being austere and highly disciplined. Leaving school at 16 without a desire to continue education, he worked as a clerk for the London Water Board.

In 1954, he began National Service but was released early after collapsing on parade and being diagnosed with Type 1 diabetes. He subsequently completed A-level correspondence courses funded by itinerant work, including periods as a grave digger and a deckchair attendant, and these enabled him to enter the London School of Economics (LSE), where he graduated with a first-class degree in Sociology in 1965.

== Academic career ==
After LSE, Mulkay was invited to move to Simon Fraser University (SFU) in Vancouver by Thomas Bottomore, after his wife was denied a US visa for his original plan to study at the University of Wisconsin. At SFU, he completed an MA thesis on the recruitment of Canadian scientists. Both he and Bottomore resigned from SFU in 1967 during a period of intense conflict within the university over student participation in governance.

Returning to Britain in 1968, he was recruited as a lecturer at the University of Aberdeen, where he wrote a PhD thesis on sociological theory, later published as Functionalism, Exchange and Theoretical Strategy. From 1970 to 1973, he served as a Research Associate at the University of Cambridge Department of Engineering. In 1973, he joined the University of York as a Reader, was appointed to a Chair in 1979 and was Head of Department 1992-5. At York, he supervised doctoral students including Nigel Gilbert, Steve Woolgar, Steve Yearley, Andrew Webster, Malcolm Ashmore and Jonathan Potter.

== Research and contributions ==
=== Scientific innovation and growth ===
Early in his career, Mulkay and Bryan Turner argued that major intellectual innovations often occur when an "over-production" of qualified experts relative to available positions forces innovation into new areas. He illustrated this with case studies in North African Islam, 19th-century French painting, and radio astronomy. Working with David Edge, he developed a three-phase model for research networks: an exploratory phase, a phase of rapid growth and consensus negotiation, and a final phase of decline and disbandment.

=== Discourse analysis and Opening Pandora’s Box ===
In the mid 1970s, Mulkay shifted his focus to how scientists construct reality through language. While studying the controversy over oxidative phosphorylation, he and Nigel Gilbert observed that scientists on both sides used experimental evidence to create persuasive accounts of their own positions. This research led to the publication of Opening Pandora's Box (1984), a foundational text for the field of discursive psychology .

=== Reflexivity and New Literary Forms ===
Mulkay became a prominent proponent of reflexivity, arguing that sociological theories about knowledge construction should also apply to the work of sociologists. To explore this, he developed "New Literary Forms," with Steve Woolgar and Malcolm Ashmore, using plays and dialogues to display the interpretive work of the analyst, most notably in The Word and the World (1985). He also utilized conversation analysis and ethnomethodology to examine the role of language, rhetoric and humour in social life, such as in Nobel Prize ceremonies and health economics.

=== The Embryo Research Debate ===
His final major research project examined the UK parliamentary debates regarding human embryo research in the 1980s. In The Embryo Research Debate (1997), he analyzed how advocates navigated moral and political dynamics to establish the Human Fertilisation and Embryology Authority. He examined how scientific arguments interacted with religion, gender politics and popular culture in shaping public opinion.

== Retirement and artistic practice ==
Mulkay retired from the University of York in 2001. He pursued creative interests, first as a basket weaver focusing on spiral rattan forms,

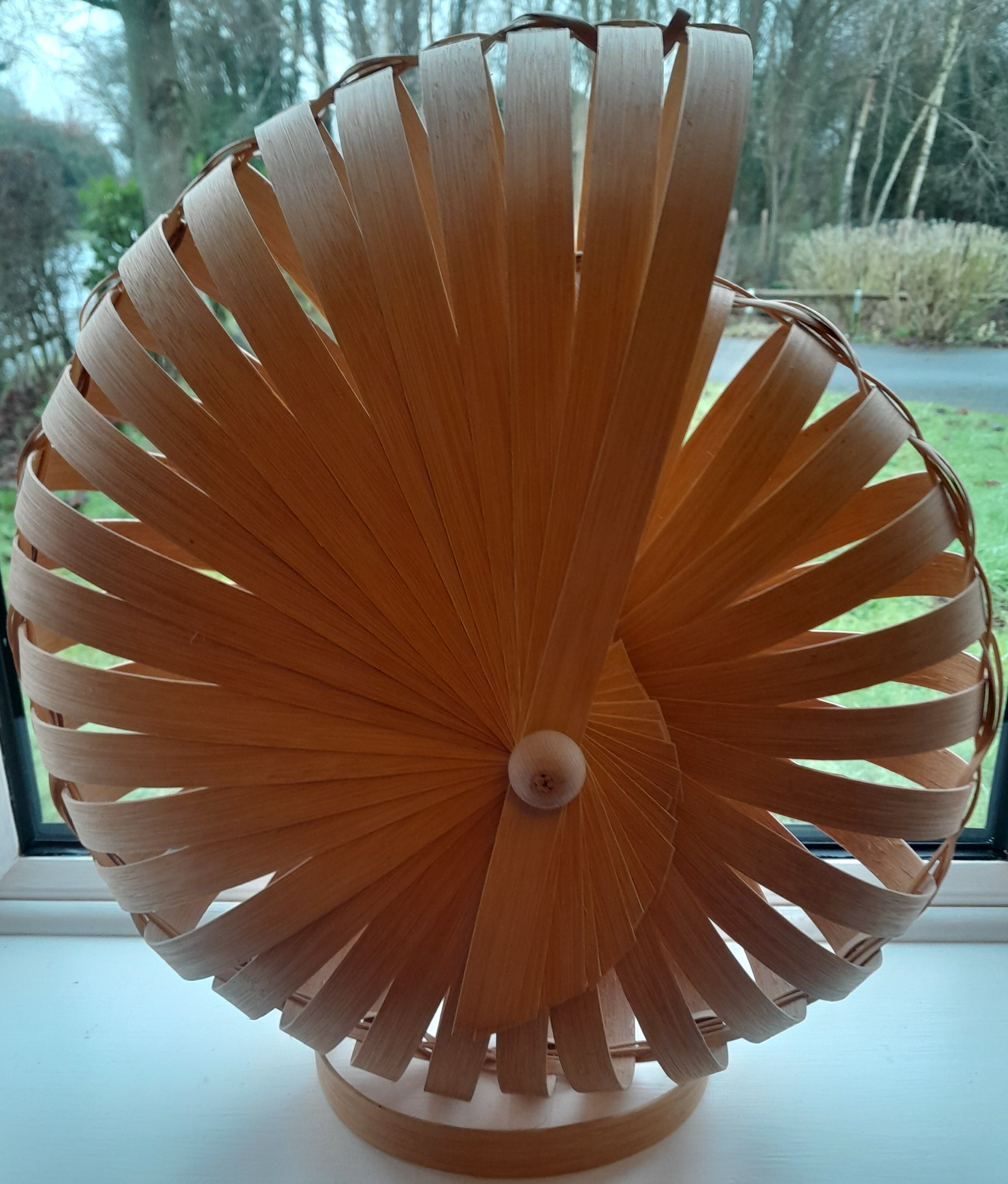
Spiral rattan form, artwork by Michael Mulakay

and later as a painter of abstract landscapes using alcohol inks. His artwork was exhibited in galleries in York

, Beverley, and Scarborough.

== Personal life and health ==
Mulkay married his wife, Lucy, a designer, in 1962; they had two daughters. He lived with Type 1 diabetes for over 70 years, receiving the Macleod Medal from Diabetes UK in 2025 for his long-term management of the condition. He died on 21 October 2025.

== Awards ==
- John Desmond Bernal Prize (1986), Society for Social Studies of Science
- Macleod Medal (2025), Diabetes UK

== Published works ==
=== Books ===
- Mulkay, M. J. (1972). The Social Process of Innovation. Macmillan.
- Edge, D. O.; Mulkay, M. J. (1976). Astronomy Transformed: The Emergence of Radio Astronomy in Britain. Wiley.
- Mulkay, M. J. (1979). Science and the Sociology of Knowledge. G. Allen & Unwin.
- Gilbert, G. N.; Mulkay, M. (1984). Opening Pandora's Box: A Sociological Analysis of Scientists' Discourse. Cambridge University Press.
- Mulkay, M. J. (1985). The Word and the World: Explorations in the Form of Sociological Analysis. Allen & Unwin.
- Mulkay, M. J. (1988). On Humour: Its Nature and Its Place in Modern Society. Polity Press.
- Pinch, T.; Mulkay, M.; Ashmore, M. (1989). Health and Efficiency: A Sociology of Health Economics. Milton Keynes, England and Philadelphia: Open University Press.
- Mulkay, M. J. (1991). Sociology of Science: A Sociological Pilgrimage. Open University Press.
- Mulkay, M. J. (1997). The Embryo Research Debate: Science and the Politics of Reproduction. Cambridge University Press.

=== Selected journal articles ===
- Mulkay, M. J.; Turner, B. S. (1971). "Over-production of personnel and innovation in 3 social settings". Sociology. 5 (1): 47–61.
- Mulkay, M. J.; Edge, D. O. (1973). "Cognitive, technical and social factors in growth of radio astronomy". Social Science Information. 12 (6): 25–61.
- Mulkay, M. J.; Gilbert, G. N.; Woolgar, S. (1975). "Problem areas and research networks in science". Sociology. 9 (2): 187–203.
- Mulkay, Michael J. (1976). "Norms and Ideology in Science". Social Science Information. 15 (4–5): 637–656.
- Mulkay, Michael; Gilbert, G. Nigel (1982). "Accounting for Error". Sociology. 16 (2): 165–183.
- Mulkay, M. (1984). "The ultimate compliment". Sociology. 18 (4): 531–549.
- Mulkay, Michael; Ashmore, Malcolm; Pinch, Trevor (1987). "Measuring the Quality of Life". Sociology. 21 (4): 541–564.
- Mulkay, Michael (1993). "Rhetorics of Hope and Fear in the Great Embryo Debate". Social Studies of Science. 23 (4): 721–742.

== See also ==
- Discourse analysis
- Sociology of scientific knowledge
- Reflexivity (social theory)
- Ethnomethodology
