= Sal Restivo =

American sociologist (born 1940)

Sal Restivo (born 1940) is a sociologist/anthropologist.

== Work ==
Restivo is a leading contributor to science studies and in particular to the sociology of mathematics. His current work focuses on the sociology of mind and brain, and the sociology of god and religion. He has also done work in the sociology of social and sociable robotics. He helped launch the ethnographic study of science in the 1970s, and is a founding member (1975) and former president (1994/95) of the Society for Social Studies of Science. He was a founding member of the Association for Humanist Sociology, and was also involved with Science for the People in its formative years and active in the Radical Science Movement.

His pioneering work in the sociology of mathematics has been a key factor in bringing social constructionism into mathematics education and the philosophy of mathematics education. He also helped to develop the science and technology studies curriculum which has become a popular major at universities throughout the US and the world. He is based in the US and worked as a professor for many years at Rensselaer Polytechnic Institute, Troy, NY. He has been awarded multiple NSF and NEH grants and fellowships as well as support from other agencies. He has been a Nordisk Forskerutdanningsakademi Professor simultaneously at Roskilde University (Denmark) and the University of Gothenburg (Sweden); a Belgian National Research Foundation Professor, Free University of Brussels (Belgium); and a Special Professor of Mathematics Education at Nottingham University (United Kingdom). He is a former Hixon/Riggs Professor of Science, Technology, and Society at Harvey Mudd College, and currently holds the title of Special Lecture Professor at the Research Institute for the Philosophy of Science and Technology at Northeastern University in Shenyang, China.

At RPI, he was Professor of Sociology, Science Studies, and Information Technology. He retired from RPI on June 30, 2012 and then spent six months as a Senior Fellow at the University of Ghent in Belgium. He is now living in Ridgewood, NY and taught in the Department of Technology, Culture, and Society at New York University Tandon School of Engineering in Brooklyn NY from 2015-2017. He attended and graduated from Brooklyn Technical High School with honors in electrical engineering; earned his BA with honors at the City College of New York. He has a PhD earned with distinction from Michigan State University.

== Published works ==
- Comparative Studies in Science and Society (C.E. Merrill, Columbus, 1974). Co-edited with C. K. Vanderpool.
- The Sociological Worldview (B. Blackwell, Oxford, 1991); Swedish edition published by Bokforlaget Korpen, Goteborg, Sweden, 1995.
- Mathematics in Society and History (Kluwer Academic Publishers, Dordrecht, 1992). Nominated for the Morris D. Forkosch Book Award of the Journal of the History of Ideas.
- Math Worlds: Philosophical and Social Studies of Mathematics and Mathematics Education (SUNY Press, Albany, 1993). Co-edited with J. P. Van Bendegem and Roland Fischer.
- Science, Society, and Values: Toward a Sociology of Objectivity (Lehigh University Press, Bethlehem PA, 1994).
- Degrees of Compromise: Industrial Interests and Academic Values (SUNY Press, Albany, 2001). Co-edited with Jennifer Croissant.
- Science, Technology, and Society: An Encyclopedia (Oxford University Press, 2005). Editor-in-Chief.
- Science, Technology, and Society: A Sociological Perspective (Blackwell Publishers, 2005). With W. Bauchspies and J. Croissant.
- Restivo, S. (1983) The Social Relations of Physics, Mysticism and Mathematics, Dordrecht: Pallas Paperback (1985), Reidel Publishing Company.
- Battleground: Science and Technology, an encyclopedia in two volumes, co-edited with Peter Denton (Greenwood Publishers, 2008).
- Restivo, S. (1983/1985) The Social Construction of Mathematics, Zentralblatt für Didaktik der Mathematik, Vol. 20, No. 1, 15-19.
- “The Will to Mathematics: Minds, Morals, and Numbers,” in Foundations of Science, 11, 1 & 2 (March 2006), 197-215, special issue on Mathematics: What Does It All Mean? Edited by Jean Paul Van Bendegem, Bart Kerkhove, and Sal Restivo, With Wenda Bauchspies. Portuguese translation, Bauchspies, W. & Restivo, S. (2001) - O arbítrio da matemática: mentes, moral e números. BOLEMA, 16, pp. 102–124.
- “Bringing Up and Booting Up: Social Theory and the Emergence of Socially Intelligent Robots,” Proceedings of the 2001 Systems, Man, and Cybernetics Conference, Tucson AZ, October 7–10, 2001.
- “What is Science?” invited essay, contributed to Life: The Science of Biology, 7th ed. by W.K. Purves et al. (Sinauer/Freeman, 2003), p. 163.
- “From a Socially Intelligent Robot Concept to an Ad: Eliciting Audience Participation throughout the Graphic Design Process”, in Design and Emotion: The Experience of Everyday Things, ed Deanna McDonagh-Philp et al., (London, Taylor & Francis; 2004). With Audrey Bennett.
- “Mechanical Mathematicians: The End of Proof as We Know It,” review essay, The Information Society, 20, 1 (January, 2004).
- “Theories Of Mind, Social Science, And Mathematical Practice,” J. P. Van Bendegem and Bart Van Kerkhove, editors, Perspectives on Mathematical Practices (Kluwer, Dordrecht, 2005/06).
- “Politics of Latour,” review essay, Organization and Environment, 8, 1 (March, 2005), 111-115.
- “Bodies of Information in the Information Age: Singing the Body Information,” review essay, Science and Public Policy, 32, 3 (June 2005), pp. 231–246.
- “Minds, Morals, and Mathematics in the Wake of the Deaths of Plato and God: Reflections on What Social Constructionism Means, Really,” pp. 37–43 in Anna Chronaki (ed.), Mathematics, Technologies, Education: The Gender Perspective (Volos, Greece: University of Thessaly Press, 2008/2010).
- Invited commentary, “Robots, Theology, and the Sociological Cogito,” Erwägen Wissen Ethik, 20, 2 (2009/2010), 222-223.
- Red, Black, and Objective: Science and the Anarchist Tradition (New York: Routledge, 2016; orig. publ. Ashgate, 2011); paperback edition, 2016
- Asphalt Children and City Streets (Rotterdam NL: Sense Publishers, 2011), co-authored with Monica Mesquita and Ubiratan D'Ambrosio.
- Worlds of ScienceCraft: New Directions in Sociology, Philosophy, and Science Studies (New York: Routledge, 2016; orig. publ. Ashgate 2014), co-authored with Sabrina Weiss and Alex Stingl; paperback edition, 2016.
- Sociology, Science, and the End of Philosophy: How Society Shapes Brains, Gods, Maths, and Logics (Palgrave Macmillan, 2017.
- The Age of the Social: The Discovery of Society and the Ascendance of a New Episteme (Routledge, 2018).
- Einstein’s Brain: Genius, Culture, and Social Networks (Palgrave PIVOT, 2020)
- Society and the Death of God (Routledge, 2021)
- Inventions in Sociology: Studies in Science and Society (Palgrave Macmillan, 2022).
