= Social objects =

Social objects are objects that gain meaning through processes of reification (e.g. ritual). Studies of this phenomenon have its origins in classical cognitive sociology, the historical traditions of the sociology of knowledge and phenomenology. A prominent work in this regard is The Rules of the Sociological Method, in which Emile Durkheim suggested the dictum, "The first and most basic rule is to consider social facts as things." This has led researchers to investigate the social and cultural contingencies of how "objects" cognitively become objects.

Actor-network theory has developed this concept as the object around which social networks form. This version was applied to social media networks by Jyri Engeström in 2005 as part of the explanation of why some social media networks succeed and some fail. Engeström maintained that "Social network theory fails to recognise such real-world dynamics because its notion of sociality is limited to just people." Instead, he proposed what he called "object centered sociality," citing the work of the sociologist Karin Knorr-Cetina. For example, Engeström maintained that much of the success of the popular photo-sharing site Flickr was because photographs serve as social objects around which conversations of social networks form.

The concept was popularized by Hugh MacLeod, cartoonist and social observer in 2007.

== See also ==
- Actor–network theory

== Bibliography ==
- Engeström, Jyri. Social Objects: What Beach balls and Potatoes Can Teach Us about Social Networks. Posted May 3, 2008.
