= Eviatar Zerubavel =

American sociologist

Eviatar Zerubavel (Hebrew: אביתר זרובבל; born November 25, 1948) is professor of sociology at Rutgers University, a specialist in the sociology of cognition and everyday life, including topics such as time, boundaries, and categorization.

== Biography ==
Zerubavel is a grandson of Ya'akov Zerubavel. Born in Israel in 1948 to parents in diplomatic service, he spent much of his childhood abroad. He studied first at the University of Tel Aviv and then received his Ph.D. in sociology from the University of Pennsylvania in 1976, where he studied under Erving Goffman. After teaching at Columbia University and the State University of New York at Stony Brook, he has spent the bulk of his career at Rutgers University. In 2003 he was awarded a Guggenheim Fellowship, and in 2007 he was recognized as a Board of Governors and Distinguished Professor of Sociology.

Zerubavel's first notable contributions were in the study of time, particularly the sociology and standardization of time. His books in this area were Patterns of Time in Hospital Life (1979); Hidden Rhythms (1981); The Seven Day Circle (1985); and Time Maps (2003).

Later he turned his attention to what he has termed cognitive sociology, pointing out how much society rather than human nature shapes our mental lives, and how much the commonalities that mark out social groups involve shared patterns of thinking. His work in this vein includes The Fine Line (1991); Terra Cognita (1992); Social Mindscapes (1997); The Elephant in the Room (2006); and Ancestors and Relatives (2011). His newest book is (2018) Taken for Granted: The Remarkable Power of the Unremarkable.

Zerubavel served for many years as director of the graduate program in Sociology at Rutgers University and mentor to many graduate students. He became very interested in academic work habits and in time management in writing. His book The Clockwork Muse (1999) gives practical advice to writers across disciplines, and in particular advice on time management to those finishing books and dissertations.

His own writing is notable for its use of multiple examples from everyday life, an approach which one of his students, Wayne Brekhus, has called "Zerubavelian" sociology.

He is married to Yael Zerubavel, a scholar of Israeli history who also teaches at Rutgers University. They have a daughter, Noga, and a son, Noam, together.
