= Epistemic cultures =

Term in the sociology of scientific study

Epistemic cultures (often used in plural form) is a concept developed in the nineties by anthropologist Karin Knorr Cetina in her book Epistemic Cultures: How the Sciences Make Knowledge. Opposed to a monist vision of scientific activity (according to which, would exist a unique scientific method), Knorr Cetina defines the concept of epistemic cultures as a diversity of scientific activities according to different scientific fields, not only in methods and tools, but also in types of reasonings, ways to establish evidence, and relationships between theory and empiry. Knorr Cetina's work is seminal in questioning the so-called unity of science.

== Knorr Cetina's anthropology ==
In practice, Knorr Cetina compares two contemporary important scientific fields: High energy physics and molecular biology. She worked as an anthropologist within two laboratories, along the line of the laboratory anthropology work by Latour and Woolgar. Her anthropological work is comparative and the two chosen scientific fields are highly mediaticized and easily distinguishable.

Epistemic cultures as a philosophical concept has been perused by numerous philosophical, anthropological or historical studies of science.

== Two distinct publication regimes ==
High energy physics and molecular biology are very different as scientific fields belonging to two different epistemic cultures. They also are very different in terms of academic authorship. Biagioli describes this difference in terms of publications culture regarding number of authors per paper, distribution of contributorship within authors, preprint policy and he precisely chooses to oppose the very same domains.
