= We Have Never Been Modern =

1991 book by Bruno Latour

- Author: Bruno Latour
- Original title: Nous n'avons jamais été modernes: Essai d'anthropologie symétrique
- Translator: Catherine Porter
- Language: English
- Subjects: Science and technology studies, philosophy of science
- Published: 1991 (La Découverte) (French); 1993 (Harvard University Press) (English)
- Publication place: France, United States
- Pages: 157
- ISBN: 0-674-94838-6
- OCLC: 27894925
- LC Class: Q175.5.L3513 1993
- Preceded by: Science in Action
- Followed by: Aramis, or the Love of Technology

We Have Never Been Modern is a 1991 book by Bruno Latour, originally published in French as Nous n'avons jamais été modernes: Essai d'anthropologie symétrique (English translation: 1993).

== Content ==
The book is an "anthropology of science" that explores the dualistic distinction modernity makes between nature and society. Pre-modern peoples, argues Latour, made no such division. Contemporary matters of public concern such as global warming, the HIV/AIDS pandemic and emerging biotechnologies mix politics, science, and popular & specialist discourse to such a degree that a tidy nature/culture dualism is no longer possible. This inconsistency has given rise to post-modern and anti-modern movements. Latour attempts to reconnect the social and natural worlds by arguing that the modernist distinction between nature and culture never existed. In other words, it would be more useful to consider ourselves "amodern" or "nonmodern". He claims we must rework our thinking to conceive of a "Parliament of Things" wherein natural phenomena, social phenomena and the discourse about them are not seen as separate objects to be studied by specialists, but as hybrids made and scrutinized by the public interaction of people, things and concepts.

"Latour speaks of modern and non-modern constitutions, each with four 'guarantees'. There is also an implicit notion of a pre-modern constitution as well, though its less codified conventions would not amount to guarantees. Each of his constitutions addresses four, so to speak, ontological realms: the subject, the object, language and being. The realm of the subject is also that of society, communities, culture and the state; the realm of the object is that of things, technologies, facts and nature; the realm of language includes practices of discourse, mediation, translation, delegation and representation; and, finally, the realm of being includes God and the gods, the immortals, the totemized ancestors – it includes questions of existence. For Latour every epoch’s constitution must have conventions and guarantees in these four ontological realms. The four guarantees of the modern constitution for Latour are: (a) that nature (i.e. things, objects) is 'transcendent', or universal in time and space; there to be discovered; (b) that society (the subject, the state) is 'immanent', i.e. it is continually constructed 'artificially' by citizens or by subjects; (c) that 'translation networks' between these first two realms are 'banned', i.e. the 'separation of powers' of these realms is 'assured'; (d) that a 'crossed out God' acts as 'arbitrator' of this dualism."

== On economics ==
Latour challenges the traditional understanding of the economy as a purely objective, quantitative, and value-free science in the book. He believes that this view fails to consider the relationships between humans and nonhumans, and argues that traditional economic measures value solely in terms of economic growth and productivity, ignoring the increasing social and ecological costs of these activities, such as environmental degradation, social inequality, and cultural loss. For example by mentioning the challenges that the separation of nature and society that has been present in economic thought poses. Latour uses various examples to critique the modern economics and suggests that economic activity is a complex, interdependent relationship between humans and nonhumans that must take into account social, cultural, and ecological factors. Latour instead argues that a more holistic and integrated approach is necessary for a sustainable and diverse society.

== Influence and misrepresentation ==
Speculative realist Graham Harman points out that Latour has been misrepresented by some as a postmodernist. Harman cites We Have Never Been Modern as crucial to understanding Latour's conceptualisation of the "postmoderns as moderns a minus sign added" and therefore dismisses accusations of Latour as a postmodernist. Harman goes on to be influenced by We Have Never Been Modern adding that postmodernism continues to be subject-centric/anthropocentric (as modernity did) in its distinction of the subject from the object. This forms the basis for Harman's object-oriented ontology.

== See also ==
- Gilbert Durand's anthropological trajectory
- Science in Action
- Politics of Nature
- Laboratory Life (With Steve Woolgar)
- André Gorz
