= Laboratory Life =

1979 book by Bruno Latour

Laboratory Life: The Social Construction of Scientific Facts
- First edition
- Author: Bruno Latour and Steve Woolgar
- Language: English
- Genre: Sociological study
- Publisher: Sage Publications, Beverly Hills
- Publication date: 1979
- Publication place: USA
- ISBN: 0-8039-0993-4
- OCLC: 256126659
- Dewey Decimal: 574/.07/2
- LC Class: QH315 .L315

Laboratory Life: The Social Construction of Scientific Facts is a 1979 book by sociologists of science Bruno Latour and Steve Woolgar.

This influential book in the field of science studies presents an anthropological study of Roger Guillemin's scientific laboratory at the Salk Institute. It advances a number of observations regarding how scientific work is conducted, including descriptions of the complex relationship between the routine lab practices performed by scientists, the publication of papers, scientific prestige, research finances and other elements of laboratory life.

The book is considered to be one of the most influential works in the laboratory studies tradition within science and technology studies (STS). It is inspired by but not entirely dependent on the ethnomethodological approach. In turn, it served as the inspiration for actor–network theory (or ANT); many of ANT's core concepts (like transcription, inscription, translation, and the deployment of networks) are present in Laboratory Life.

== Introduction and Methodology ==
Latour and Woolgar state that their work "concerns the way in which the daily activities of working scientists lead to the construction of scientific facts" (pp. 32). Laboratory Life therefore stands in opposition to the study of scandalous moments in which the so-called "normal" operation of science was disrupted by external forces. In contrast, Latour and Woolgar give an account of a how scientific facts are produced in a laboratory in situ, or as it happens.

== An Anthropologist Visits the Laboratory ==
The initial methodology of Laboratory Life involves an "anthropological strangeness" (40) in which the laboratory is a tribe foreign to the researcher. The study of the lab begins with a semi-fictionalized account of an ignorant observer who knows nothing of laboratories or scientists. In this account, Latour and Woolgar "bracket" (44) their previous knowledge of scientific practice and ironically ask seemingly-nonsensical questions about observed practices in the laboratory, such as "Are the heated debates in front of the blackboard part of some gambling contest?" In the asking and answering of these questions, the observer's understanding of laboratory practices is gradually refined, leading to a strong focus on the significance of paper documents.

The observer soon recognizes that all the scientists and technicians in the lab write in some fashion, and that few activities in the lab are not connected to some sort of transcription or inscription. The foreign observer describes the laboratory as "strange tribe" of "compulsive and manic writers ... who spend the greatest part of their day coding, marking, altering, correcting, reading, and writing" (48-9). Large and expensive laboratory equipment (such as bioassays or mass spectrometers) are interpreted as "inscription device[s]" that have the sole purpose of "transform[ing] a material substance into a figure or diagram" (51). In this way, the observer works to organize and systematize the laboratory such that it "began to take on the appearance of a system of literary inscription" (52).

Having concluded that the "production of papers" for publication in a scientific journal is the primary focus of a laboratory, the observer next aims to "consider papers as objects in much the same way as manufactured goods" (71). This involves asking how papers are produced, what their constituent elements (or raw materials) are, and why these papers are so important. First, the authors recognize that in papers, "some statements appeared more fact-like than others" (76). From this observation, a five-element continuum of facticity is constructed, which spans from type 5 statements which are taken for granted to type 1 statements which are unqualified speculations, with various intermediate levels in between. The conclusion reached is that statements in a laboratory routinely travel up and down this continuum, and the main purpose of a laboratory is to take statements of one level of facticity and transform them to another level.

However, Latour and Woolgar recognize that this semi-fictionalized account of an ignorant observer aiming to systematize the alien laboratory has several problems. While the observer's rich descriptions of activity in the lab are taken as accurate, the observer has not established that the interpretation of this data in terms of literary inscription is exhaustive or the only way in which laboratory life can be analyzed. In the authors' words, the observer's account is not "immune from all possibility of future qualification" (88).

== The Construction of a Fact: The Case of TRF(H) ==
The next chapter aims at giving a precise account of the way in which this process operates with respect to a single scientific fact: the peptide TRF(H). This historical account, which Latour and Woolgar admit is, like all histories, a "necessarily literary fiction" (107), has the ostensible purpose of qualifying the initial account given by the observer. To this end, the chapter focuses on the specific way in which TRF(H) was constructed as a fact, describing how one scientist, Guillemin, "redefine[d] the TRF subspecialty solely in terms of determining the structure of the substance" (119). As sequencing TRF(H) required far more sophisticated equipment and techniques than merely determining its physiological effects, Guillemin raised the cost of entry to this field and cut his potential competitors by three-fourths.

The authors next claim that the fact regarding TRF(H)'s structure progressed by decreases in the number of "'logically' possible alternatives" (146). However, Latour and Woolgar critique the explanation that "logic" or "deduction" is a satisfactory and complete explanation for the specific way in which a scientific fact is constructed. Instead, as their historical account of TRF(H) shows, the "list of possible alternatives by which we can evaluate the logic of a deduction is sociologically (rather than logically) determined" (136). Specifically, the material, technical, and human resources of a laboratory affected what kinds of challenges and counter-facts could be constructed and formulated, leading Latour and Woolgar to later conclude that "the set of statements considered too costly to modify constitute what is referred to as reality" (243).

In the previous section, Latour and Woolgar used a semi-fictional observer to describe the laboratory as a literary system in which mere statements are turned into facts and vice versa. The most sound and established facts were those statements which could be divorced from their contingent circumstances. The authors next aim to interrogate how this process operates on a very small and specific scale by looking at how this process operated with respect to the molecule TRF(H), whose molecular structure went through various stages of facticity both in and out of the laboratory Latour studied. In this section, Latour and Woolgar aim to "specify the precise time and place in the process of fact construction when a statement became transformed into a fact and hence freed from the circumstances of its production" (105).

Instead of trying to construct a "precise chronology" of what "really happened," in the field, they aim to demonstrate how "a hard fact can be sociologically deconstructed" (107) by showing how it emerged in what they call a network. A network is "a set of positions within which an object such as TRF has meaning" (107), and they recognize that TRF only has meaning within certain networks. For example, outside of the network of post-1960s endocrinology, TRF is "an unremarkable white powder" (108), which leads to the claim that a "well-established fact loses its meaning when divorced from its context" (110). Latour and Woolgar stress that "to say that TRF is constructed is not to deny its solidity as a fact. Rather, it is to emphasize how, where, and why it was created" (127).

== The Microprocessing of Facts ==
This chapter turns back from grander historical accounts to the micro details of laboratory life. Through analysis of the conversations and discussions between scientists at the lab, it shows that the grander notion of science as a debate of contrasting ideas influences actual scientists only through social mechanisms. Instead of attempting to do their studies more carefully to be sure they get the right answer, scientists appear to only use as much care as they think will be necessary to defeat the counterarguments of their detractors and get the acclamation they desire for their work.

It also notes that the stories scientists tell about the history of their field often omit social and institutional factors in favor of "moment of discovery" narratives. For example, one scientist tells this story:

Slovik proposed an assay but his assay did not work everywhere; people could not repeat it; some could, some could not. Then one day Slovik got the idea that it could be related to the selenium content in the water: they checked to see where the assay worked; and indeed, Slovik's idea was right, it worked wherever the selenium content of water was high. (169)

This story is contrasted with another story based on interviews with the participants: The University of California required that graduate students get credits in a field totally unrelated to their own. Sara, one of Slovik's students, fulfilled this requirement by taking selenium studies, since it had a vague relation to her major. Graduate students had a tradition of informal seminars where they discussed these unrelated classes. At one meeting, Sara presented a paper on the effects of Selenium on cancer and noted that someone on campus proposed that the geographical distribution of selenium content in water might correlate with the geographical distribution of cancer rates. Slovik was at the meeting and thought that this might explain the geographical difference in his assay working. He phoned a colleague to tell him the idea and ask him to test the selenium in the water.

One story says merely that Slovik "got the idea"—the other notes that institutions (the University, grad student meetings) and other people (Sara, the colleague) provided key pieces of the inspiration.

The chapter closes by arguing that scientists do not simply use their inscription devices to discover already-existing entities. Instead, they project new entities out of the analysis of their inscriptions. Statements to the effect that "it's amazing they were able to discover it" only make sense when one ignores the arduous process to construct the discovery out of the inscriptions available. Similarly, justifications that the discovery is valid because it works well outside the laboratory are fallacious. Any claims as to whether a new substance like TRF works are only valid in a laboratory context (or its extension) -- the only way one can know that the substance is actually TRF (and thus that TRF is working) is through laboratory analysis. However, the authors stress that they are not relativists—they simply believe that the social causes of statements should be investigated.

== Cycles of Credit ==
Scientists frequently explain their choice of field by referring to curves of interest and development, as in "peptide chemistry [is] tapering off ... but now ... this is the future, molecular biology, and I knew that this lab would move faster to this new area" (191). Desire for credit appears to only be a secondary phenomenon; instead a kind of "credibility capital" seems to be the driving motive. In a case study, they show one scientist sequentially choosing a school, a field, a professor to study under, a specialty to get expertise in, and a research institution to work at, by maximizing and reinvesting this credibility (i.e. ability to do science), despite not having received much in the way of credit (e.g. awards, recognition).

Four examples: (a) X threatens to fire Ray if his assay fails, (b) a number of scientists flood into a field with theories after a successful experiment then leave when new evidence disproves their theories, (c) Y supports the results of "a big shot in his field" when others question them in order to receive invitations to meetings from the big shot where Y can meet new people, (d) K dismisses some of L's results on the grounds that "good people" won't believe them unless the level of noise is reduced (as opposed to K thinking them unreliable himself).

The credibility of a scientist and their results is largely seen as identical. "For a working scientist, the most vital question is not 'Did I repay my debt in the form of recognition because of the good paper he wrote?' but 'Is he reliable enough to be believed? Can I trust him/his claim? Is he going to provide me with hard facts?'" (202) CVs are the major way this credibility is proven and career trajectories are the story of its use. Technicians and minor leaguers, by contrast, do not accumulate capital but instead are paid a "salary" by major leaguers.

== Editions ==
English

- 1979. Beverly Hills: Sage Publications. ISBN 0-8039-0993-4.
- (online preview), Princeton, New Jersey: Princeton University Press, 1986, ISBN 0-691-09418-7, OCLC 4775088. Paperback ISBN 0-691-02832-X.

The preface to the second edition (1986) reads:

"The most substantial change to the first edition is the addition of an extended postscript in which we set out some of the reactions to the book's first publication in the light of developments in the social study of science since 1979. The postscript also explains the omission of the term "social" from this edition's new subtitle."

So social construction becomes just construction of scientific facts. This change indicates a shift from social constructivism to Actor-network theory, which leaves more room for the non-social or 'natural' (albeit in a non-naturalistic / non-essentialist sense).

French

- 1988. La Vie de laboratoire : la Production des faits scientifiques, Paris: La Découverte. ISBN 2-7071-4848-2, OCLC 19298021.

== See also ==
- Politics of nature
- Science in Action (book)
- Aramis, or the Love of Technology
- We Have Never Been Modern
