= Science in Action (book) =

Book by Bruno Latour

- Author: Bruno Latour
- Language: English
- Publisher: Harvard University Press
- Publication date: 1987
- Pages: 288
- ISBN: 0-674-79290-4
- OCLC: 13820884
- Dewey Decimal: 306/.45 19
- LC Class: Q175.5 .L38 1987

Science in Action: How to Follow Scientists and Engineers Through Society is a seminal book by French philosopher, anthropologist and sociologist Bruno Latour first published in 1987. It is written in a textbook style, proposes an approach to the empirical study of science and technology, and is considered a canonical application of actor-network theory. It also entertains ontological conceptions and theoretical discussions making it a research monograph and not a methodological handbook per se.

In the introduction, Latour develops the methodological dictum that science and technology must be studied "in action", or "in the making". Because scientific discoveries turn esoteric and difficult to understand, it has to be studied where discoveries are made in practice. For example, Latour turns back time in the case of the discovery of the "double helix". Going back in time, deconstructing statements, machines and articles, it is possible to arrive at a point where scientific discovery could have chosen to take many other directions (contingency). Also the concept of "black box" is introduced. A black box is a metaphor borrowed from cybernetics denoting a piece of machinery that "runs by itself". That is, when a series of instructions are too complicated to be repeated all the time, a black box is drawn around it, allowing it to function only by giving it "input" and "output" data. For example, a CPU inside a computer is a black box. Its inner complexity doesn't have to be known; one only needs to use it in his/her daily activities.

Henning Schmidgen describes Science in Action as an anthropology of science, a manual where the main purpose is “a trip through the unfamiliar territory of 'technoscience'”. Similarly Science in Action has been described as "A guide that explains how to account for processes of making knowledge, facts, or truths. A guide designed to be used on site, while observing the negotiations and struggles that precede ready-made science".

== Criticism ==
Latour's work, including Science in Action, has been extremely influential on the field of Science and technology studies having been taught at preeminent institutions such as Massachusetts Institute of Technology. However one critic, Olga Amsterdamska, stated in a book review: "Somehow, the ideal of a social science whose only goal is to tell inconsistent, false, and incoherent stories about nothing in particular does not strike me as very appealing or sufficiently ambitious." Despite this harsh rejoinder, her criticism had little impact on the field.

== See also ==
- Laboratory Life (with Steve Woolgar)
- Politics of Nature
- We Have Never Been Modern
