= Stephen Park Turner =

American philosopher and sociologist (born 1951)

Stephen Park Turner (born March 1, 1951) is an American philosopher and sociologist who researches social practice, political theory, and the philosophy of the social sciences. He serves as Graduate Research Professor and Distinguished University Professor in the Department of Philosophy at the University of South Florida. His published work examines tacit knowledge, causality in statistical modeling, and the institutional development of American sociology.

== Early life and education ==
Turner was born on March 1, 1951, in Chicago, Illinois, to Lawrence L. Turner and Natalie Stephens. He enrolled at the University of Missouri in Columbia, where he earned a Bachelor of Arts in 1971, a Master of Arts in sociology in 1971, and a Master of Arts in philosophy in 1972, before completing his doctorate in sociology in 1975. His doctoral dissertation focused on philosophical translation within sociological explanation and was published in 1980 by Cambridge University Press as Sociological Explanation as Translation.

== Academic career ==
Turner joined the faculty at the University of South Florida in 1975 as an assistant professor, was promoted to associate professor in 1979 and to full professor in 1984, and was appointed Graduate Research Professor in Sociology in 1987. In 1989, his primary appointment transitioned to the Department of Philosophy while retaining the Graduate Research Professor title and receiving the designation of Distinguished University Professor.

Throughout his career, Turner has held visiting faculty appointments at Virginia Tech in 1982, the University of Notre Dame in 1985, and Boston University in 1987. Internationally, he completed research fellowships at the Swedish Collegium for Advanced Study in Uppsala, Sweden, and received a research fellowship from the National Endowment for the Humanities in 1991.

== Research and theory ==
Turner's research spans the philosophy of science, sociological theory, and the history of social science. In his 1994 book The Social Theory of Practices: Tradition, Tacit Knowledge, and Presuppositions, he criticizes standard sociological models of culture and shared norms. He argues that collective concepts such as "tradition" or "shared worldview" cannot be transmitted across populations without accounting for the individual, physical mechanisms of learning and transmission.

In Explaining the Normative (2010), Turner examines the conflict between philosophical accounts of normativity and empirical social science. He rejects the claim that normative facts require special, non-empirical modes of explanation, proposing instead that social science can account for rule-following behavior without postulating abstract moral realms. His work in political sociology focuses on the role of technical experts in modern governance. In Liberal Democracy 3.0 (2003), he analyzes "epistemic inequality"—the growing gap between specialized experts and the democratic electorate—and examines how reliance on technical authority affects public deliberation. He returned to these themes in The Politics of Expertise (2014).

In historical sociology, Turner co-authored The Impossible Science: An Institutional Analysis of American Sociology (1990), which evaluates the institutional growth and disciplinary fractures of sociology in the United States from 1890 to 1990. He also investigated the methodological foundations of Max Weber's sociological theories. In Max Weber: The Lawyer as Social Thinker (1994), authored with Regis A. Factor, Turner demonstrates that Weber's concepts of causality and legal probability were derived directly from 19th-century German jurisprudence.

=== Cognitive science and the social ===
Turner integrates findings from cognitive neuroscience with social theory, focusing especially on the implications of mirror-neuron research for the concept of tacit knowledge. He challenges conventional models in the human sciences that assume agents share identical, fixed mental structures, arguing instead that what appears to be a shared scheme of tacit presuppositions is better understood as a response to the practical demands of mutual understanding between individuals. His 2018 book Cognitive Science and the Social: A Primer addresses the conceptual challenges of integrating neuroscience into sociological accounts of tacit knowledge and mirror neurons. He argues that cognitive science reveals variation in individual learning rather than uniform shared expectations across communities.

=== Administrative power and expertise ===
Turner analyzes the administrative state as an epistemological problem, questioning the assumption that modern governance operates through neutral scientific expertise. He argues that expert judgment depends on tacit skills that resist full codification and is frequently subject to genuine disagreement among experts themselves, complicating the idea that deference to expertise can be a straightforwardly neutral basis for policy. In a 2021 book chapter on academic freedom, Turner examined how discretionary legal and administrative power inside universities has expanded through mechanisms such as institutional review boards, research misconduct tribunals, and Title IX enforcement, arguing that this expansion has reshaped the traditional understanding of academic freedom and put pressure on classical rule-of-law ideals of predictability and limited discretion.

=== Science studies and the economics of science ===
Turner has contributed to science studies by analyzing the political economy of scientific knowledge, including the history of science funding and patronage. With Daryl Chubin, he has argued that the culture of science has shifted from an emphasis on discovery to one on productivity, from scientific autonomy to external accountability, and from personal reputation to competition for funding, and that this shift in incentives helps account for rising rates of retraction, fraud, and other strains on research integrity. In "Normal Accidents of Expertise" (2010), Turner adapts Charles Perrow's concept of a "normal accident"—a catastrophic failure arising from complex, tightly coupled systems—to the production of expert knowledge, arguing that as systems of expert knowledge become more tightly coupled and oriented toward immediate problem-solving rather than long-term inquiry, they become more prone to this kind of systemic breakdown. He has also examined how the same expansion of discretionary administrative power within universities—including research misconduct tribunals and other internal compliance regimes—that he describes in his work on academic freedom bears on the governance of research integrity.

== Selected publications ==
=== Books ===
- Outhwaite, William; Turner, Stephen (2018). The SAGE Handbook of Political Sociology. London: SAGE Publications. ISBN 978-1-4739-1946-4.
- Adair-Toteff, Christopher; Turner, Stephen (2019). The Calling of Social Thought: Rediscovering the Work of Edward Shils. Manchester: Manchester University Press. ISBN 978-1-5261-2005-2.
- Turner, Stephen (2018). Cognitive Science and the Social: A Primer. New York: Routledge. ISBN 978-0-8153-8567-7.
- Turner, Stephen (2014). The Politics of Expertise. New York: Routledge. ISBN 978-0-415-70943-9.
- Turner, Stephen (2010). Explaining the Normative. Cambridge: Polity Press. ISBN 978-0-7456-4256-7.
- Turner, Stephen (2003). Liberal Democracy 3.0: Civil Society in an Age of Experts. London: SAGE Publications. ISBN 978-0-7619-5469-9.
- Turner, Stephen (2002). Brains/Practices/Relativism: Social Theory after Cognitive Science. Chicago: University of Chicago Press. ISBN 978-0-226-81740-8.
- Turner, Stephen (1994). The Social Theory of Practices: Tradition, Tacit Knowledge, and Presuppositions. Chicago: University of Chicago Press. ISBN 978-0-226-81738-5.
- Factor, Regis A.; Turner, Stephen (1994). Max Weber: The Lawyer as Social Thinker. London: Routledge. ISBN 978-0-415-06751-5.
- Turner, Stephen; Turner, Jonathan H. (1990). The Impossible Science: An Institutional Analysis of American Sociology. Newbury Park: SAGE Publications. ISBN 978-0-8039-3838-0.
- Turner, Stephen (1986). The Search for a Methodology of Social Science: Durkheim, Weber, and the Nineteenth-Century Problem of Cause, Probability, and Action. Dordrecht: D. Reidel. ISBN 978-90-277-2067-2.
- Factor, Regis A.; Turner, Stephen (1984). Max Weber and the Dispute over Reason and Value: A Study in Philosophy, Ethics, and Politics. London: Routledge & Kegan Paul. ISBN 978-0-7100-9889-4.
- Turner, Stephen (1980). Sociological Explanation as Translation. Cambridge: Cambridge University Press. ISBN 978-0-521-29773-8.
