= Andrew Webster (sociologist) =

English sociologist (1951–2021)

Andrew Webster (1951–2021) was an English sociologist who was a professor of sociology at the University of York, where he established the Science and Technology Studies research unit. He studied the sociocultural and economic implications of introducing biomedical technologies, including stem cell research and regenerative medicine, into clinical settings.

== Education ==
Webster received the Bachelor of Science degree in social sciences at the Polytechnic of the South Bank in 1974. He went on to study the sociology of science at the University of York, and received the Doctor of Philosophy degree in 1981.

== Career ==
Webster worked at the Cambridgeshire College of Arts and Technology (now Anglia Ruskin University) until 1999, when he became a faculty member at the University of York. He founded the Science and Technology Studies Unit (SATSU) in 1988 and continued directing the research unit at the University of York until 2017. He has held international visiting fellowships at several universities, including Australian National University, the University of Gothenburg and the University of Sydney. From 2004 to 2009, Webster headed the Department of Sociology at York, and he was the Dean of Social Sciences from 2009 to 2013.

In 2007, Webster was elected as Fellow of the Academy of Social Sciences. He received the annual 4S Mentoring Award from the Society for Social Studies of Science in 2017. The award committee wrote that "Webster's mentoring has not only focused on supporting individual students but also creating institutional environments for them," and credited him with helping SATSU become a Marie Curie training site.

Webster has received funding from UK and international agencies to study how biomedical technologies such as stem cell research and regenerative medicine emerge and are adopted in clinical settings, as well as the sociocultural and economic implications of those technologies. He has been a member of several policy steering committees of the Medical Research Council, including the UK Stem Cell Bank Steering Committee and the Medical Ethics Committee. His research includes the study of "institutional readiness", examining the challenges that health care systems face when introducing regenerative medicine. The concept was adopted by advanced therapy treatment centres in the UK's National Health Service in order to identify the capacities they need to adopt the new techniques.

== Selected publications ==
- Webster, Andrew; Martin, Paul; Lewis, Graham; Smart, Andrew (2004). "Integrating pharmacogenetics into society: in search of a model". Nature Reviews Genetics. 5 (9): 663–669. doi:10.1038/nrg1430. PMID 15372088. S2CID 2051307.
- ——; Eriksson, Lena (2008). "Governance-by-standards in the field of stem cells: managing uncertainty in the world of 'basic innovation'". New Genetics and Society. 27 (2): 99–111. doi:10.1080/14636770802077009. S2CID 145071994.
- ——; Haddad, Christian; Waldby, Catherine (2011). "Experimental heterogeneity and standardisation: Stem cell products and the clinical trial process". BioSocieties. 6 (4): 401–419. doi:10.1057/biosoc.2011.17. S2CID 143638568.
- Gardner, John; —— (2016). "The social management of biomedical novelty: Facilitating translation in regenerative medicine". Social Science & Medicine. 156: 90–97. doi:10.1016/j.socscimed.2016.03.025. PMID 27019143.
- Gardner, John; ——; Barry, Jacqueline (2018). "Anticipating the clinical adoption of regenerative medicine: building institutional readiness in the UK". Regenerative Medicine. 13 (1): 29–39. doi:10.2217/rme-2017-0121. PMID 29360014.
