= Andrew Pickering =

British academic (born 1948)

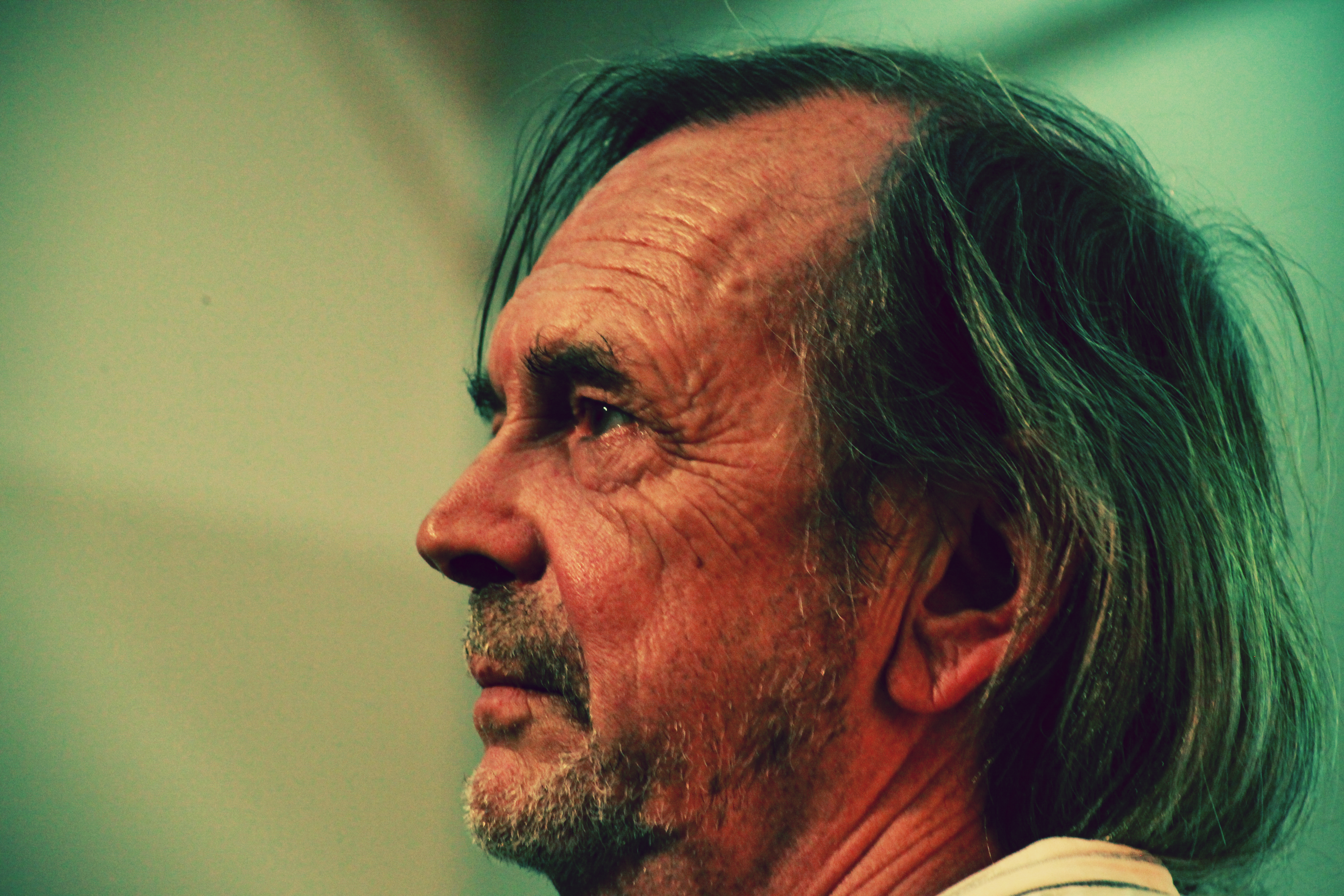
- Andrew Pickering, 2011
- Born: 1948 (age 77–78)

Academic work
- Main interests: Sociology of science
- Notable works: Constructing Quarks: A Sociological History of Particle Physics; The cybernetic brain: sketches of another future.

Andrew Pickering (born 1948) is a British sociologist, philosopher and historian of science at the University of Exeter. He was a professor of sociology and a director of science and technology studies at the University of Illinois at Urbana-Champaign until 2007. He holds a doctorate in physics from the University of London, and a doctorate in Science Studies from the University of Edinburgh. He is known for his book Constructing Quarks: A Sociological History of Particle Physics (1984).^{[a]}

== Career ==
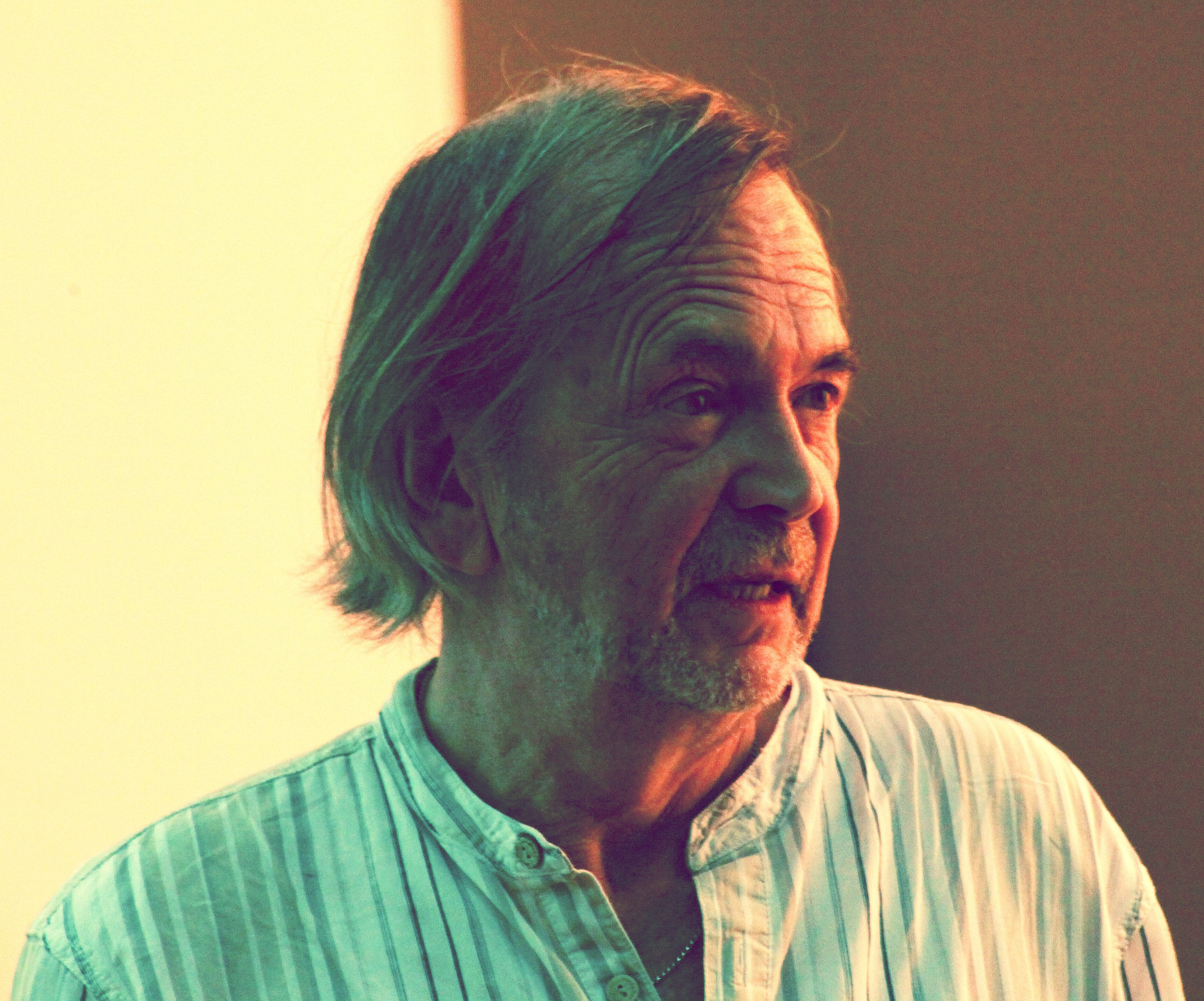
Andrew Pickering in 2011

In elucidating some of the sociological factors prevailing in particle physics, Pickering also wrote a number of papers for journals and conferences. According to Pickering, theory and experiment come in packages, and traditions of experiment generate just the kind of data which will fuel further theorising, while traditions of theory generate new problems for further development.

Pickering thus described two theoretical frameworks in particle physics: 'old physics' – which at the time of its death, was "still alive" – dominated high energy physics through the 1960s and into the early 1970s, and concerned itself with 'common [particle physics] phenomena'. 'New physics' refers to the theory and experiment 'package' concerned with rare phenomena, such as the search for quarks. While each theoretical framework had little to say about the other, and "was useless in the phenomenal world of its rival", each was satisfactory in its own terms. Despite this, Pickering also outlined a process of "magical transmutation", where new theories are produced from old, by what he called "analogical recycling". Pickering said that all this is symptomatic of Kuhnian type revolutions.

He authored The mangle of practice: Time, agency and science (University of Chicago Press, 1995), where he develops a performative conception of scientific practice, focusing on non-human agency and strongly contributing to the posthumanist trend of Science and Technology Studies. Pickering considers Cybernetics as a type of nomad science that, instead of seeking to dominate reality as its modern counterpart (thus leading to processes of enframing, following Heidegger) rather develops an ontological theatre between humans and non-humans.

== Selected publications ==
=== Books ===
- Pickering, Andrew (1995). The Mangle of Practice: Time, Agency, and Science. Chicago, Illinois: University of Chicago Press. ISBN 9780226668031.
- Pickering, Andrew (1999). Constructing Quarks: A Sociological History of Particle Physics. Chicago, Illinois Chichester: University of Chicago Press Wiley. ISBN 9780226667997.
- Pickering, Andrew; Guzik, Keith (2008). The Mangle in Practice: Science, Society, and Becoming. Durham, North Carolina: Duke University Press. ISBN 9780822390107.
- Pickering, Andrew (2010). The Cybernetic Brain: Sketches of Another Future. Chicago, Illinois: University of Chicago Press. ISBN 9780226667898.

=== Chapters in books ===
- Pickering, Andrew (1982), "Interests and Analogies", in Barnes, Barry; Edge, David O. (eds.), Science in Context: Readings in the Sociology of Science, Cambridge, Massachusetts: MIT Press, pp. 125–146, ISBN 9780262520768
- Pickering, Andrew (1982), "Elementary Particles: Discovered or Constructed?", in Trower, W. Peter; Bellini, Gianpaolo (eds.), Physics in Collision: High-Energy ee/ep/pp Interactions, volume 1, New York, New York: Plenum Press, pp. 439–448, ISBN 9780306409967
- Pickering, Andrew (1992), "From Science As Knowledge to Science As Practice", in Pickering, Andrew (ed.), Science As Practice and Culture, Chicago, Illinois: University of Chicago Press, pp. 1–28, ISBN 9780226668017
- Pickering, Andrew; Stephanides, Adam (1992), "Constructing Quaternions: On the Analysis of Conceptual Practice", in Pickering, Andrew (ed.), Science As Practice and Culture, Chicago, Illinois: University of Chicago Press, pp. 139–167, ISBN 9780226668017
- Pickering, Andrew (2004), "The Science of the Unknowable: Stafford Beer's Cybernetic Informatics", in Rayward, W. Boyd; Bowden, Mary Ellen (eds.), The History and Heritage of Scientific and Technological Information Systems, Medford, New Jersey: Information Today, Inc., pp. 29–38, ISBN 9781573872294

=== Journal articles ===
- Pickering, Andy (November 1980). "Exemplars and Analogies: A Comment On Crane's Study of Kuhnian Paradigms in High-Energy Physics". Social Studies of Science. 10 (4). SAGE: 497–502. doi:10.1177/030631278001000404. S2CID 143591669.
- Pickering, Andy (November 1980). "Reply to Crane". Social Studies of Science. 10 (4). SAGE: 507–508. doi:10.1177/030631278001000406. S2CID 143542867.
- Pickering, Andrew (June 1981). "The Hunting of the Quark". Isis. 72 (2). University of Chicago Press: 216–236. doi:10.1086/352719. JSTOR 230970. S2CID 143315645.
- Pickering, Andy (November 1990). "Knowledge, Practice and Mere Construction". Social Studies of Science. 20 (4). SAGE: 683–729. doi:10.1177/030631290020004006. S2CID 144574043.

== Notes ==
a. See Dalitz (1985) for a critical review of this book.
