= Steve Woolgar =

British sociologist (born 1950)

Stephen Woolgar
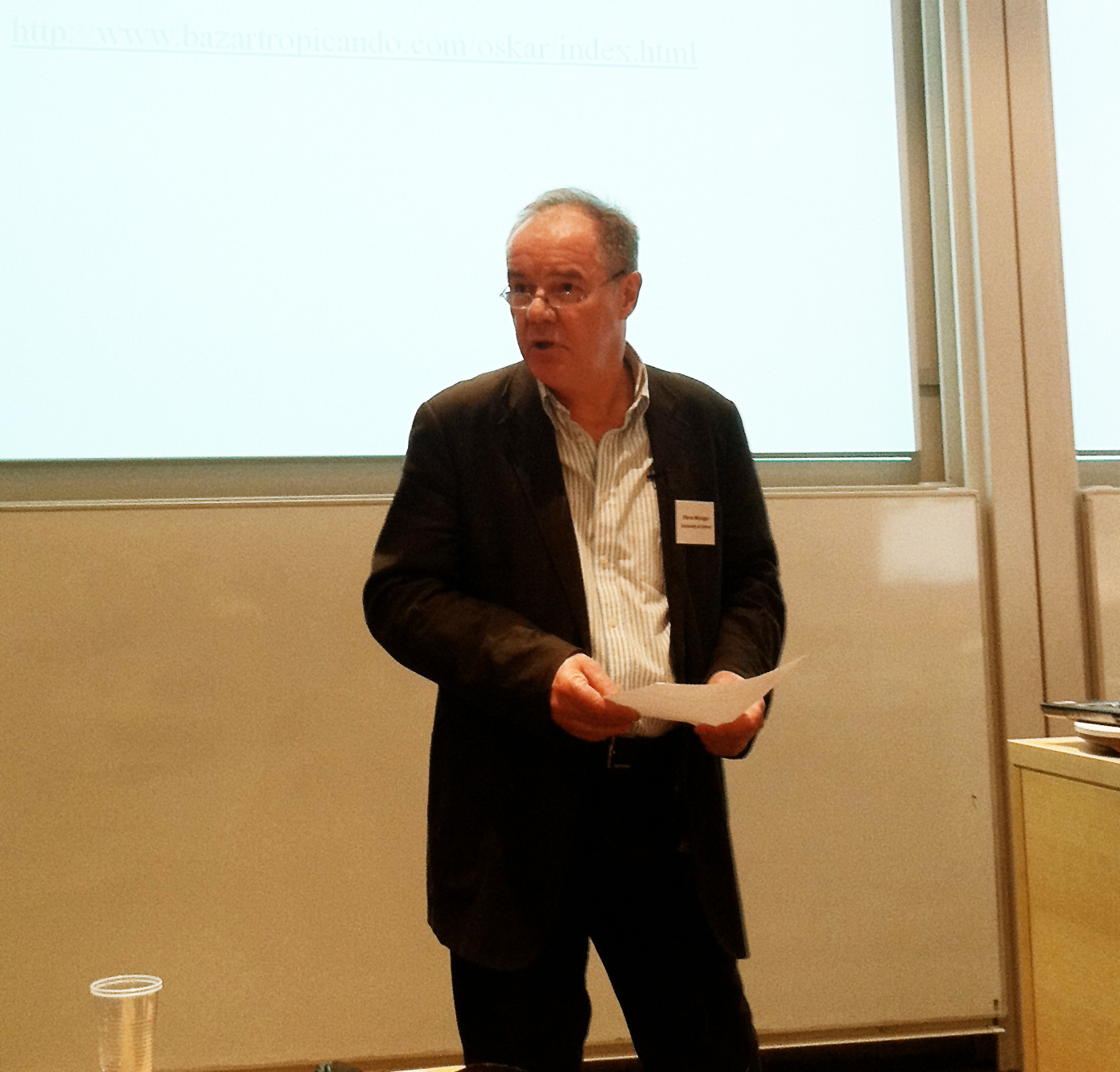
- Born: 14 February 1950 (age 76)

Academic background
- Education: University of Cambridge (BA/PhD)

Academic work
- Main interests: Science & Technology Studies (STS)
- Notable works: Laboratory Life: The Construction of Scientific Facts

Stephen William Woolgar (born 14 February 1950) is a British sociologist. He worked closely with Bruno Latour, with whom he wrote Laboratory Life: The Construction of Scientific Facts (1979).

== Education ==
Stephen Woolgar holds a BA (First Class Honours) in engineering and a PhD in sociology, both at the University of Cambridge.

== Career ==
Woolgar was Professor of Sociology and Head of the Department of Human Sciences and director of CRICT (Centre for Research into Innovation, Culture and Technology) at Brunel University until 2000. He then held the Chair of Sociology and Marketing at the University of Oxford where he was a fellow at Green Templeton College. He is the former director of Science and Technology Studies within Oxford's Institute for Science, Innovation and Society. He is (2022) now emeritus Professor at Oxford, and also at Linköping University where he worked more briefly in the late 2010s.

== Contributions ==
Woolgar is a contributor in the fields of science studies, sociology of scientific knowledge (SSK) and the science and technology studies (STS) (especially on the topic of sociology of machines). He wrote Laboratory Life: The Construction of Scientific Facts (1979), a social constructionist account of the practice of science, together with Bruno Latour, who he first met in California when Latour was conducting his early ethnographic work in scientific facilities. Woolgar has subsequently adopted an even more relativist stance, for example in his 1988 book Science: The Very Idea. Woolgar espouses a radically relativist and constructionist position. In 1985 he wrote a paper proposing a sociological approach towards machines and AI, in which he outlined the importance of associating AI with the field of sociology.

== Awards ==
- Recipient of the 2008 John Desmond Bernal Prize, awarded annually by the Society for Social Studies of Science to an individual judged to have made a distinguished contribution to the field.
- Fulbright Scholarship and a Fulbright Senior Scholar award.
- Academy of Social Sciences, 2010.

== Selected bibliography ==
=== Books ===
- Woolgar, Steve; Latour, Bruno (1986) [1979]. Laboratory life: the construction of scientific facts. Princeton, New Jersey: Princeton University Press. ISBN 9780691094182. Originally published 1979 in Los Angeles, by SAGE Publications
- Woolgar, Steve (1993) [1988]. Science: the very idea. London New York: Routledge. ISBN 9780415084758.
- Woolgar, Steve (1988). Knowledge and reflexivity: new frontiers in the sociology of knowledge. London: Sage. ISBN 9780803981201.
- Woolgar, Steve; Fuller, Steve; de Mey, Marc; Shinn, Terry (1989). The cognitive turn: sociological and psychological perspectives on science. Dordrecht, Netherlands: Springer. ISBN 9789401578257.
- Woolgar, Steve; Lynch, Michael (1990). Representation in scientific practice. Cambridge, Massachusetts: MIT Press. ISBN 9780262620765.
- Woolgar, Steve; Grint, Keith (1997). The machine at work: technology, work, and organization. Cambridge, UK Malden, Massachusetts: Polity Press. ISBN 9780745609256.
- Woolgar, Steve (2002). Virtual society? Technology, cyberbole, reality. Oxford New York: Oxford University Press. ISBN 9780191593963.
- Woolgar, Steve; Lynch, Michael; Coopmans, Catelijne; Vertesi, Janet (2014). Representation in scientific practice revisited. Cambridge, Massachusetts: MIT Press. ISBN 9780262525381.
- Nigel Thrift, Adam Tickell, Steve Woolgar, William H. Rupp. (2014) Globalization in Practice. Oxford University Press.
- Annamaria Carusi, Aud Sissel Hoel, Timothy Webmoor, Steve Woolgar (eds.). (2020) Visualization in the Age of Computerization. Routledge.
- Steve Woolgar, Daniel Neyland (2020). Mundane Governance: Ontology and Accountability. Oxford University Press.
- Steve Woolgar, Else Vogel, David Moats and Claes-Fredrik Helgesson (eds. (2022) The Imposter as Social Theory – Thinking with Gatecrashers, Cheats and Charlatans. Bristol University Press. ISBN 978-1529213089

=== Chapter in books ===
- Woolgar, Steve (1992), "Some remarks about positionism: A reply to Collins and Yearley", in Pickering, Andrew (ed.), Science as practice and culture, Chicago: University of Chicago Press, pp. 327–342, ISBN 9780226668017.

=== Journal articles ===
- Woolgar, Steve; Mulkay, Michael; Gilbert, G. Nigel (May 1975). "Problem areas and research networks in science". Sociology. 9 (2). Sage: 187–203. doi:10.1177/003803857500900201. S2CID 145579542.
- Woolgar, Steve (August 1981). "Interests and explanation in the social study of science". Social Studies of Science. 11 (3). Sage: 365–394. doi:10.1177/030631278101100304. S2CID 143629573.
- Woolgar, Steve; Pawluch, Dorothy (February 1985). "Ontological gerrymandering: The anatomy of social problems explanations". Social Problems. 32 (3). Oxford University Press: 214–227. doi:10.2307/800680. JSTOR 800680.
- Woolgar, Steve (November 1985). "Why not a Sociology of Machines? The Case of Sociology and Artificial Intelligence". Sociology. 19 (4). Sage: 557–572. doi:10.1177/0038038585019004005. S2CID 143156873.
