= Social Studies of Science =

- Discipline: Science and technology studies, history of science, philosophy of science, sociology of science
- Language: English
- Edited by: Nicole Nelson; Sergio Sismondo

Publication details
- Former name: Science Studies (until 1975, ISSN 0036-8539)
- History: 1971–present
- Publisher: SAGE Publications
- Frequency: Bimonthly
- Impact factor: 4.038 (2020)

Standard abbreviations
- ISO 4: Soc. Stud. Sci.

Indexing
- ISSN: 0306-3127 (print); 1460-3659 (web)
- LCCN: 75645506
- OCLC no.: 2242476

Links
- Journal homepage; Online access; Online archive

Social Studies of Science is a bimonthly peer-reviewed academic journal that publishes papers relating to the history and philosophy of science. The journal's editors-in-chief are Nicole Nelson, Associate Professor in the Department of Medical History and Bioethics at the University of Wisconsin-Madison, and Sergio Sismondo, Professor of Philosophy and Arts & Sciences at Queen's University. The journal was established in 1971 under the name Science Studies and assumed its present title in 1975. It is currently published by SAGE Publications.

== Founding ==
In the 1971 inaugural issue, the founding editors, Roy MacLeod and David Edge, announced that the journal "will devote itself to original research, whether empirical or theoretical, which brings fresh light to bear on the concepts, processes and consequences of modern science. It will be interdisciplinary in the sense that it will encourage appropriate contributions from political science, sociology, economics, history, philosophy, social anthropology, and the legal and educational disciplines. It will welcome studies of fundamental research, applied research and development; of university science, industrial science and science in government."

== Past editors ==
- Roy MacLeod (1971-1991)
- David Edge (1971-2002)
- Michael Lynch (2002-2012)
- Nicole Nelson (2022-2023)
- Sergio Sismondo (2012-present)

== Abstracting and indexing ==
Social Studies of Science is abstracted and indexed in Scopus and the Social Sciences Citation Index. According to the Journal Citation Reports, its impact factor is 3.2, ranking it 6th out of 111 journals in the category "History of Philosophy and Science".
