= Boundary organization =

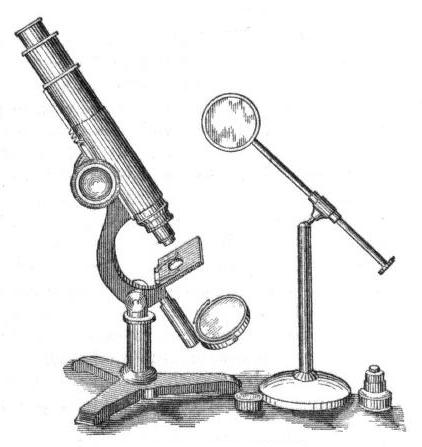
Science eg. microscope

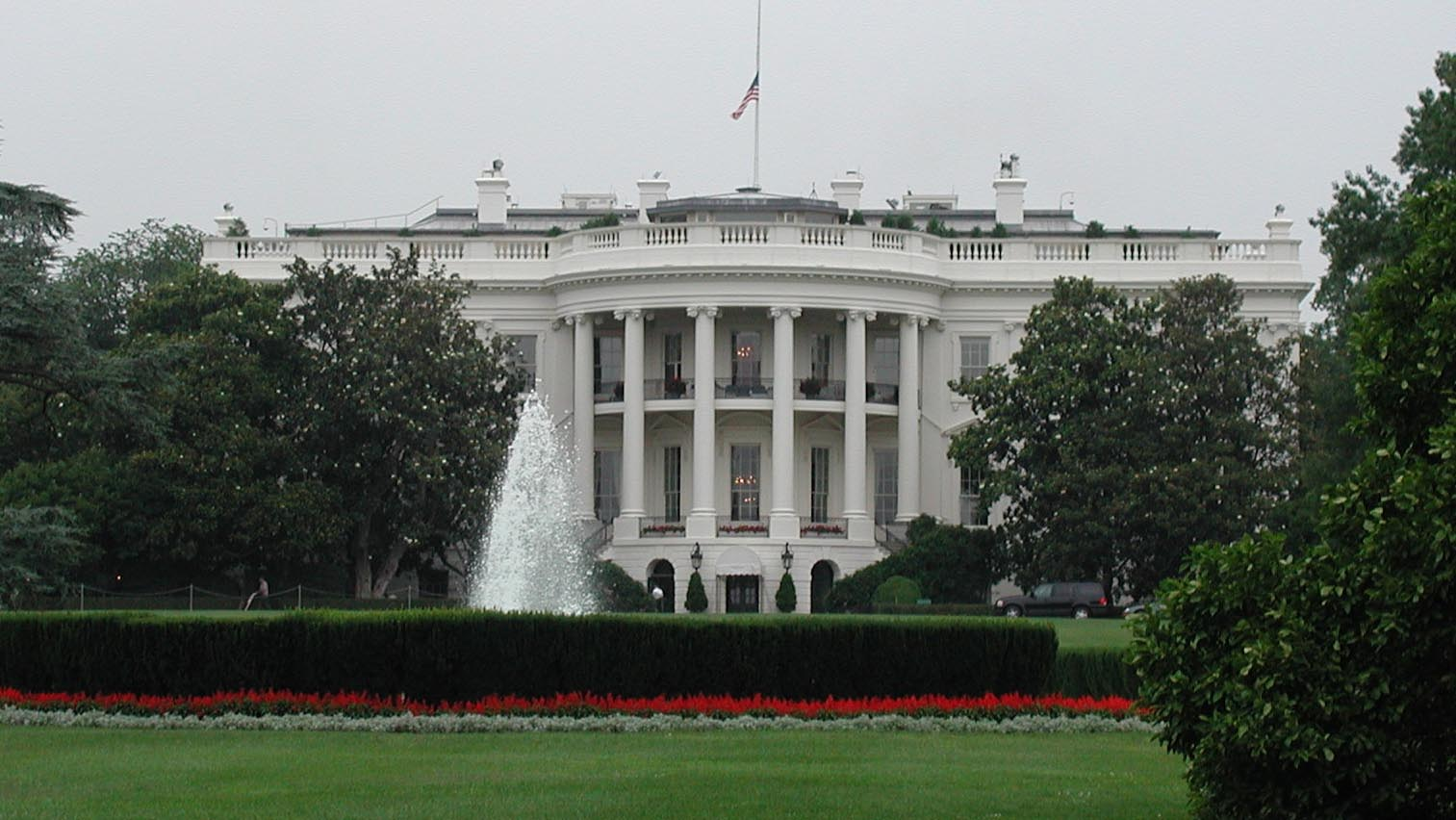
Politics eg. white house

A boundary organization is a formal body jointly generated by the scientific and political communities to coordinate different purposes and promote consistent boundaries and mutually comprehensible interactions. Boundary organizations provide an institutionalized place for the development of long-term relationships, the promotion of two way communication, the development and use of management tools, and the negotiations on the boundaries of the problem itself. According to Carr and Wilkinson, boundary organizations are increasingly becoming networks and social arrangements between scientific and political institutions. On the international level, boundary organizations are most frequently set up for governments to deal with environmental issues.

Boundary organizations have three key characteristics. First of all, they include the involvement of scientists and politicians, along with Professionals who coordinate them. Secondly, boundary organizations provide chances and reasons to create Boundary objects. For example, mediums that can help different parties within the boundary organizations to communicate with each other. Last but not least, they have a responsibility to ensure that research and policy groups can understand each other since these two communities are very different from each other.

== Development ==
The concept "boundary organization" was originally coined by Guston (1999) to discuss the concept of boundary work to illustrate why the distinction between science and non-science is not as subtle as formerly thought. Guston put forward the idea of boundary organizations to stabilize the boundary between scientists and policymakers. These organizations are responsible for both communities through different branches located between these communities and provide each community with different and potentially conflicting goals. Traditionally, boundary organizations are analyzed on the basis of their interactions with scientific and political communities. In Guston's analysis of boundary communities in the United States, they seem to require both the scientific knowledge to check the accuracy of the knowledge they used and political organizations for the legality of their political orientations.

The development of boundary organization theory is based on a crucial neglected institutional problem in American social science and politics as the scientific and political systems in America has been stable for long enough to enable new types of institutions to promote and develop between them. However, the traditional concept of boundary organization indicates that the interaction between science and politics is a stationary process instead of a dynamic development, it also fails to realize that some boundary organizations involves multiple boundaries and large amounts of stakeholders, these boundary organizations are much more complicated than the original model of boundary organization which was put forward by Guston.

In terms of the expansion of boundary organization theory, Miller introduces four hybrid management strategies that provide enhanced management structure of boundary organizations in 2001, which are hybridization, deconstruction, boundary work, and cross-domain orchestration. In 2013, Wehrens, Bekker, and Bal further expanded Miller's work in their research; they described those four hybrid management strategies are "case- and context-sensitive". Which means that same strategy can be used at various circumstances to meet distinct goals, same kind of strategies can lead to different results, one strategy can be effective under particular situation, but problematic in another time. Miller and Wehrens et al. suggest that a boundary organization should function in a hybrid way and management structure should be carefully applied to suit the organization itself, their perspectives provide a more dynamic view from Guston's original boundary organization theory.

In addition, Parker and Crona adopt a concept called the "land of tensions" to further expand the theory of boundary organizations. According to them, there are four aspects which are important to stakeholders of a boundary organization, which are whether the boundary organization can achieve an efficient management of "disciplinary and interdisciplinary" researches, what are long run and short run goals, the capability of the organization to conduct analysis and apply the findings into practice, whether the organization aims for "autonomy and consultancy". With the contribution of all these researchers, the boundary organization theory shifts towards a broad and dynamic direction.

== Methodology ==
Boundary organizations are frequently applied in complicated situations to manage and encourage the knowledge-producing process because of their ability to analyze problems from multiple aspects and generate various solutions for decision-makers. The success of boundary organizations depends on the leaders of both the scientific and political communities to provide them with useful resource. A productive boundary organization would have the capability of pleasing both central agencies, maintaining internal instability and external stability beyond the actual border. An organization is successful in carrying out these actions can be seen as the stability of boundaries.

Boundary organization serves as a secure space can be established through good relations and procedures for negotiating disputes. With the support of model leaders, the interaction between these elements is critical to solving the problem. Through these capabilities, boundary organizations can successfully guide disputes and mediation between different interests while maintaining a firm focus on science. Using cognitive science to reconstruct this problem has been a success in this area. Success further demonstrates that legitimacy has been established between partners and stakeholders, not only through ongoing and frequent disputes but also through the ability to benefit from and successfully control unforeseen events.

There are two significant parts for boundary organizations to participating in joint research: one is promoting cooperation between scientists and non-scientists, another one is creating a comprehensive scientific and social order through the production and standardized packaging of boundary objects. Besides, boundary organizations may use a standard option to include external organizations in their decision-making processes as a transitional method, but their main focus is still trying to maintain the right balance between scientific and political principles.

== Advantages ==
The boundary organization provides a strategic website for studying the process of transferring information and provides a system to combine knowledge from various communities for single research. The existence of boundary organizations can facilitate collaboration between scientists and politicians, and as a result, generate a large number of various social interactions and relationships between researchers and politicians. For a long period of time, boundary organizations have been regarded as an effective method of relating knowledge and practice, reflecting the forms of interdisciplinary and multi-institutional cooperation in the field of scientific research. During the process of jointly producing knowledge, the concept of boundary organization also make contributions to stabilizing the boundary between political and scientific communities while helping these two communities maintain their own independence and authority. Researches show that work produced by a boundary organization shares a higher level of diversity and is easier to be accepted by a large number of professionals.

Besides, boundary organizations provide critical practical tools for research and public policy linkages; therefore, create the potential to strengthen the capability of using science to enhance human well-being and enable international governments to make decisions on environmental problems. Moreover, boundary organization is an essential means to promote decision-makers to absorb scientific information. The concept of boundary organization is significant because it states that the interplay of scientific and political communities is a dynamic and two-way action instead of a simple one-way knowledge transfer from the scientific world to the political world.

Miller best describes the need for boundary organization: to find institutions, networks, and cultural approaches to combine order and knowledge while managing to maintain their internal mechanism and build effective relationships between each other. Boundary organizations play three different roles: coordinating between scientific and political groups, existing between two different social worlds, bearing clear responsibility on two sides of the boundary. Efficient boundary organizations can mediate cultural differences between members, encourage them to understand each other, and give space for them to reflect on their own cultural and intellectual characteristics if needed.

According to O'Mahony and Bechky, social systems have both challengers and defenders. Through material cooperation and partnership, boundary organizations bridge different worlds and enable challengers and defenders to protect their competitive interests. Boundary organizations collaborate by recruiting participants based on their converging interests. Boundary organizations can develop a mechanism which allows the existence of different interests, adapts to the different interests of different political parties, and most significantly, strengthens the integration of interests. These boundary organizations have a more durable structure that encourages all communities to identify their own interests and later generate a common goal which all groups are willing to work for. These shared goals include enhancing sustainability, strengthen all involved communities' problem-solving capabilities, achieving social improvement. For boundary organizations, the improvement of social situation can be considered as a sign of success after any of environmental, political, economic, or social events.

The tasks of boundary organizations are complicated but well-organized. One strength of boundary organizations is that they encourage communication between Experts from different communities during the knowledge-transfer and knowledge-producing processes. The participants of boundary organizations can discuss issues, prioritize researches, plan the rehabilitation, conduct surveys, and take parts in other programs at the same time. Because the work of boundary organizations needs the joint efforts of various communities and is beneficial for all participants, boundary organizations take a unique place in the society which is extremely hard and nearly impossible for other groups or organizations to replace. As a matter of fact, some researches have suggested that boundary organization structure shows the direction for many current organizations to transform and grow.

== Weaknesses ==
The problems of boundary organizations include the different interest of scientific and political communities, the divergences in the culture and knowledge transfer process, and the lack of productive cooperation between scientists and Politicians.

Since this theory was initially created on the basis of American politics, focusing on the characteristics of governments and the broader institutional environment which cannot be applied to the relationships between countries on the international level. With regards to international relations, science and politics are indistinguishable because they no longer operate in a highly polarized American political culture. The original boundary organization theory is static and cannot adapt to the rapid changes brought by the process of globalization. The definition of politics and science in America is clear; however, international boundary organizations do not operate among clearly defined institutions.

According to Miller, when it comes to the researches on the international environment, many unsteady assumptions can be found on the traditional boundary organization model. One flaw of the traditional model is its tendency to over-unitized scientific and political communities, although the boundary organization theory identifies that these two communities have different life forms, it often eliminates the institutional differences between them. These differences require to be paid great attention to when it comes to international relations. Thus, researchers should pay more attention to the differences between various groups and try to understand the actions of specific boundary organizations. From the perspective of international relations, the deficiency of traditional boundary organization theory is that it puts forward an overly static scientific and political viewpoint. Real changes in global governance arrangements now clearly demonstrate the flexibility of science and politics at the international level. In terms of cultural and geopolitical differences, the definition and criteria of expertise are as controversial as the concept of appropriate political institutions governing the global public sector.

As a boundary organization, knowledge and practical actions between developed and developing countries face many challenges. Getting the best experts involved is crucial when trying to solve problems or combine expertise. However, one obstacle to this collaboration is that experts from one community may not be able to understand the theories and practices of another community. As a matter of fact, what is accepted in one area may actually make no sense at all to another group, and this can preclude any potential collaboration.

Moreover, while the term boundary organizations is widely used, it does not represent any clear structure of an organization or provides any direction about how to manage such organizations. Boundary organization is generally only used as a concept during the research of the cooperation of scientific and political communities.
