= Underworld of philosophy =

Concept in the philosophy of science

In philosophy, the underworld of philosophy consists of ideas that either violate important canons of reasoning or which are simply so far out and unfamiliar that they are ignored. However the expression is often used poetically to denote other things, such as philosophy as a whole (contrasted to science), dead philosophers in limbo etc.

Compare to unknown knowns.

== See also ==
- Boundary-work
- Demarcation problem
