= Darlene Pagano =

Feminist activist, radio producer, and editor

Darlene Pagano is a feminist activist, radio producer, and editor. She is most famous for her conversational piece "Racism and Sadomasochism: A Conversation with Two Black Lesbians" published in collaboration with Karen Sims and Rose Mason in a radical feminist anthology entitled Against Sadomasochism: A Radical Feminist Analysis, for which she is also credited as co-editor.

== Career ==
Darlene Pagano was a collective member at "A Woman's Place" bookstore in Oakland, California in the late 1970s and early 1980s. "A Woman's Place," founded in 1974, was known as one of the first feminist bookstores in the U.S. and home to a collective of lesbian, feminist and progressive activist women who ran the store, including Pagano. Early on in the store and the collective's existence, Pagano took a firm stance against the display and sale of books that included the expression of sadomasochism, and the store's ensuing policy to discontinue such content became heavily criticized by the Samois, a lesbian-feminist BDSM organization primarily based out of San Francisco, California.

In 1982, irreconcilable differences among the six person collective operating the bookstore resulted in two persons (a member of the collective and a former member of the collective) changing the locks on the door, after they decided that they wanted the bookstore to continue running under the guidance of a two-person collective only. The other four members of the collective (Darlene Pagano, Elizabeth Summers, Keiko Kubo, and Jesse Meredith), exiled from the bookstore, responded in kind by branding themselves as the "Locked Out 4" and organized to reclaim the bookstore, which drew widespread attention from feminists across the nation. The details of the inter-collective fight and the legal issues raised that resulted in the library's short-lived run are detailed in a book published by Kristen Hogan in 2016 titled The Feminist Bookstore Movement: Lesbian Antiracism and Feminist Accountability.

== Works ==
In 1982, as a result of her interest in opposing sadomasochism and expanding the feminist movement, Darlene Pagano served as co-editor of Against Sadomasochism: A Radical Feminist Analysis and co-authored two articles from the anthology. The essays included are written by a number of notable radical feminists, namely Alice Walker, Robin Morgan, Kathleen Barry, Diana E. H. Russell, Susan Leigh Star, Ti-Grace Atkinson, John Stoltenberg, Sarah Lucia Hoagland, Susan Griffin, Cheri Lesh, and Judith Butler. In particular within the anthology, Pagano is known for her alignment with black lesbian feminists Karen Sims and Rose Mason in condemning sadomasochism as a practice that lacked sensitivity to the black female experience as it could be historically linked to similar forms of sexual dominance and violence enacted against black female slaves in the U.S. just a century prior. Since then, the anthology, and Pagano's collaborative article "Racism and Sadomasochism: A Conversation with Two Black Lesbians" has been cited as crucial to understanding the sadomasochism debate, which factored in as one of the many contestations of the period known as the Feminist sex wars.

== Legacy ==
Pagano's AWP Bookstore papers are held in the collection of the GLBT Historical Society.
