= D. A. Clarke =

American feminist writer and activist

- Writing career
- Pen name: De Clarke or DeAnander
- Language: English
- Years active: 1980–present
- Notable work: Justice Is A Woman With A Sword
- Literary movement: Radical feminism

D. A. Clarke (also known as De Clarke and DeAnander) is an American radical feminist essayist and activist, notable for her development of feminist theory, and for the anonymous poem privilege.

== Career ==
Much of Clarke's writing addresses the link between violence against women and market economics, although she may be best known for her 1991 essay "Justice Is A Woman With A Sword". In that essay, which she has updated twice for editions of the anthology Transforming a Rape Culture, she argues that feminist theory has taken a dogmatic approach to nonviolence and that women's self-defense, violent feminist activism, and the encouragement of positive media portrayals of violent women (such as in Kill Bill or Xena: Warrior Princess) have not been given the serious consideration they should receive and that their dismissal from mainstream feminism, while it may ultimately be desirable, has not been based on a properly thorough analysis. Her most popular work, however, may be the one least often correctly attributed to her: the early poem privilege, which has been found on dorm refrigerators and bulletin boards ascribed to 'Anonymous.' In this case, at least, Anonymous really was a woman.

In addition to being published in print anthologies, much of her work has appeared online. Clarke also had brief visibility as an amateur/indie musician, with one album "messages" released on cassette in the mid 80's.

== Selected bibliography ==
=== Books ===
- Clarke, D.A. (1981). Banshee. Portland, Maine: Peregrine Press.

Preview poem: Clarke, D.A. (1981). "privilege". NoStatusQuo. Nikki Craft.

- Clarke, D.A. (1985). To live with the weeds. Santa Cruz, California: HerBooks Feminist Press. OCLC 19511196. A solo collection of poetry.
- Clarke, D.A.; Goff, Stan (2006). Sex & War. Berkeley, California: Soft Skull Press. ISBN 9781411643802.

=== Chapters in books ===
- Clarke, D.A. (1981), "Stack o wheats: an exercise in issues", in Delacoste, Frédérique; Newman, Felice (eds.), Fight back!: feminist resistance to male violence, Minneapolis, Minnesota: Cleis Press, pp. 254–259, ISBN 9780939416011. Feminist anthology.
- Clarke, D.A. (1985), "Consuming passions: some thoughts on history, sex, and free enterprise", in Reti, Irene (ed.), Unleashing feminism: critiquing lesbian sadomasochism in the gay nineties, Santa Cruz, California: HerBooks Feminist Press, ISBN 9780939821044.
- Clarke, D.A. (1992), "The evidence of pain", in Russell, Diana E.H.; Radford, Jill (eds.), Femicide: the politics of woman killing, New York Toronto: Twayne Publishers, pp. 331–336, ISBN 9780805790283. Pdf.

See also:

"Introduction" to chapter by Diana E. H. Russell pp. 325-327.
"The incredible case of the Stack o' Wheat prints" by Nikki Craft pp. 327-331.
"The rampage against Penthouse" by Melissa Farley pp. 339-345.

- Clarke, D.A. (2004), "Prostitution for everyone: feminism, globalisation and the 'sex' industry", in Whisnant, Rebecca; Stark, Christine (eds.), Not for sale: feminists resisting prostitution and pornography, North Melbourne, Victoria: Spinifex Press, pp. 206–209, ISBN 9781876756499.
- Clarke, D.A. (2005), "Justice is a woman with a sword: some thoughts on women, feminism, and violence", in Buchwald, Emilie; Fletcher, Pamela; Roth, Martha (eds.), Transforming a rape culture (2nd ed.), Minneapolis, Minnesota: Milkweed Editions, pp. 311–322, ISBN 9781571312693.

=== Journal articles ===
- Clarke, D.A. (Summer–Fall 1989). "Moving expenses (short story)" (PDF). Sinister Wisdom. 38. Elana Dykewomon: 11–29.
- Clarke, D.A. (June 1990). "Whose tale is this? A review of the film The Handmaid's Tale". Off Our Backs. 20 (6). off our backs, inc.: 12–13. JSTOR 25797432.
- Clarke, D.A. (July–August 1998). "Do men need prostitution". Feminista! The Journal of Feminist Construction. 2 (3–4). Archived from the original on October 7, 2007. (archived at Archive.org)
- Clarke, D.A. (May 2000). "What is Feminism?". Feminista! The Journal of Feminist Construction. 3 (10). Archived from the original on October 7, 2007. (archived at Archive.org)
- Clarke, D.A.; Cutler Page, Juliette (May 2000). "Necro-Feminism". Feminista! The Journal of Feminist Construction. 3 (10). Archived from the original on October 10, 2007. (archived at Archive.org)

=== Essays ===
- Clarke, D.A. (1982). "The evidence of pain". Exposure.
- Clarke, D.A. (1991). "Justice is a woman with a sword". NoStatusQuo. Nikki Craft.
- Clarke, D.A. (1993). "Consuming passions: some thoughts on history, sex, and free enterprise". NoStatusQuo. Nikki Craft.
- Clarke, D.A. (November 2000). "The Nader dilemma" (PDF). Feminists for Nader. No Status Quo.
- Clarke, D.A. (October 2002). "Scandals of sexual greed: the Catholic Church and pedophiles". Z Magazine. Z Communications. Archived from the original on October 24, 2007. (archived at Archive.org)
- Clarke, D.A. (9 October 2004). "What is beauty anyway?". Media Watch. WordPress. Archived from the original on June 22, 2008. (archived at Archive.org)

See also: Whisnant, Rebecca. "Rebecca Whisnant class: chat with readers of "Why is Beauty On Parade"". University of Dayton. Archived from the original on February 4, 2005. (archived at Archive.org, archive date 4 February 2005)

- Clarke, D.A. (9 October 2004). "Political exposure: the breast". Media Watch. WordPress. Archived from the original on May 12, 2010. (archived at Archive.org)

=== Interviews ===
- Reti, Irene (2004), "Interview with D.A. Clarke", in Reti, Irene (ed.), Out in the redwoods: documenting gay, lesbian, bisexual, transgender history at the University of California, Santa Cruz 1965-2003, Santa Cruz: Santa Cruz, California: Regional History Project, University Library, University of California, ISBN 9780972334310.

A documentary oral history project.

=== Blogs ===
- Feral Scholar Shared blog of Stan Goff and DeAnander (archived at Archive.org)
- Lazy Quote Diary (D.A. Clarke's blog at European Tribune)
