= Video-based reflection =

Reflective practice technique

Video-based reflection is a reflective practice technique in which video recordings, rather than one's own memory, is used as a basis for reflection and professional growth. Video-based reflection is used with moderation in various professional fields, e.g. in the field of education and pedagogy. Several workshop formats can be described as based on video-based reflection, e.g. "Videobased Reflection on Team Interaction" (The ViRTI Method; Due & Lange 2015) within the conversation analytic school of research, or the concept of Marte Meo, a method of educational counseling.

== In the education field ==
Individual teachers can practice video-based reflection, but it is more commonly done when teachers are a part of video clubs. Research about the effect that video club participation can have on teacher practice has been done by Katherine A. Linsenmeier, Miriam Gamoran Sherin, and Elizabeth van Es.

=== Individual video-based reflection ===
Research indicates that teachers can benefit from video-based reflection, even when done apart from a group. Individuals using this mode of reflection tend to write longer and have more specific reflections than when writing a reflection using memory alone. This practice has also been shown to help pre-service and novice teachers focus their attention on their students' learning rather than on their own experiences.

=== Video clubs ===
Video clubs are formed by groups of teachers who want to investigate a specific aspect of their teaching practice. These clubs often meet on a monthly basis to view and discuss a video clip of a member's teaching. Teachers participating in video clubs focused on student learning report feeling better able to notice and respond to student learning during instruction.
