= Thomas F. Gieryn =

American sociologist (born 1950)

Thomas F. Gieryn (born 1950) is Rudy Professor of Sociology at Indiana University. He is also the Vice Provost of Faculty and Academic Affairs. In his research, he focuses on philosophy and sociology of science from a cultural, social, historical, and humanistic perspective. He is known for developing the concept of "boundary-work," that is, instances in which boundaries, demarcations, or other divisions between fields of knowledge are created, advocated, attacked, or reinforced. He has served on many councils and boards, including the advisory board of the exhibition on "Science in American Life" by the Smithsonian's National Museum of American History. He retired in 2015 from his professorship at Indiana University.

== Awards ==
- 1982, Edwin H. Sutherland Teaching Award, Department of Sociology, Indiana University
- 1994, President's Award for Distinguished Teaching, Indiana University
- 1990, Gieryn won the Robert K. Merton Book Award from the Section on Science, Knowledge and Technology of the American Sociological Association.

== Bibliography ==
- Gieryn, Thomas F. (1980). Patterns in the selection of problems for scientific research : American astronomers, 1950-75. [S.l.] OCLC 65769225.
- Merton, Robert (1980). Science and social structure : a festschrift for Robert K. Merton. Thomas F. Gieryn (ed.). New York N.Y.: New York Academy of Sciences. ISBN 978-0-89766-043-3.
- Merton, Robert King; Aaron. Rosenblatt; Thomas F. Gieryn (1982). Social research and the practicing professions. Cambridge, Mass.: Abt Books. ISBN 0-89011-569-9.
- Wagenaar, Theodore C.; Thomas F. Gieryn; Donald Light; Suzanne Infeld Keller; Craig J. Calhoun (1989). Readings and review for sociology, fifth edition. New York: McGraw-Hill. ISBN 978-0-07-557130-8. ISBN 0-07-557130-7.
- Gieryn, Thomas F.; Susan E. Cozzens (1999). Theories of science in society. Science, technology, and society. Ann Arbor, Mich.: Books on Demand. ISBN 0-253-31471-2. OCLC 222846100.
- Gieryn, Thomas F. (1999). Cultural boundaries of science : credibility on the line. Chicago: University of Chicago Press. ISBN 0-226-29261-4.

== See also ==
- Sociology of scientific knowledge
- Conflict thesis
- Demarcation problem
- Science wars
