= Diana E. H. Russell =

South African sociologist and activist

Diana Russell
- Born: Diana Elizabeth Hamilton Russell; 6 November 1938; Cape Town, South Africa
- Died: 28 July 2020 (aged 81); Berkeley, California, US
- Education: University of Cape Town, London School of Economics, Harvard University
- Occupations: Professor emerita, feminist, author, and activist
- Writing career
- Period: 1967–2020
- Literary movement: Women's rights, human rights, Anti-Apartheid Movement
- Website: dianarussell.com

Diana E. H. Russell (6 November 1938 – 28 July 2020) was a feminist writer and activist. Born and raised in Cape Town, South Africa, she moved to England in 1957, to the USA in 1961. For the past 45 years she was engaged in research on sexual violence against women and girls. She wrote numerous books and articles on rape, including marital rape, femicide, incest, misogynist murders of women, and pornography. For The Secret Trauma, she was co-recipient of the 1986 C. Wright Mills Award. She was also the recipient of the 2001 Humanist Heroine Award from the American Humanist Association. She was also an organizer of the First International Tribunal on Crimes against Women, in Brussels in March 1976.

== Early life ==
Russell was born and raised in Cape Town, South Africa, a twin and the fourth of the six children of a South African father, James Hamilton Russell, and a British mother, Kathleen Mary (née Gibson) Russell. She attended Herschel Girls' School, an Anglican boarding school for girls. After her BA in psychology from the University of Cape Town, aged 19 Russell left for England.

In the UK, she enrolled in a Post-Graduate Diploma in Social Science and Administration at the London School of Economics and Political Science. In 1961, she passed the Diploma with Distinction and also received the prize for the best student in the program. In the Fall of 1963, she moved to the USA where she had been accepted into an interdisciplinary PhD program at Harvard University. Her research focused on sociology and the study of revolution.

Russell's radical activism began with her involvement in the anti-apartheid movement in South Africa. In 1963, Russell had joined the Liberal Party of South Africa that had been founded by Alan Paton, the author of Cry the Beloved Country. While participating in a peaceful protest in Cape Town, Russell was arrested with other party members. She came to the conclusion that non-violent strategies were futile against the brutal violence and repression of the white Afrikaner police state. Thereafter, she joined the African Resistance Movement (ARM), an underground revolutionary movement fighting apartheid in South Africa. The principal strategy of the ARM was to bomb and sabotage government property, and though Russell was only a peripheral member of the ARM, she still risked a 10-year incarceration if caught. Russell's analysis of strategies and tactics for social and political change is detailed in her book, Rebellion, Revolution, and Armed Force: A Comparative Study of Fifteen Countries with Special Emphasis on Cuba and South Africa (1974).

== Research and writings on rape and sexual abuse ==
Rape and other forms of men's sexual exploitation and abuse of women was one of the primary focuses of Russell's research and writings. In her book, The Politics of Rape (1975), Russell suggested that rape was a display of socially defined perceptions of masculinity instead of deviant social behavior. Her other books in this area are Rape in Marriage (1982), Sexual Exploitation: Rape, Child Sexual Abuse, and Workplace Harassment (1984). In 1986, Russell published The Secret Trauma: Incest in the Lives of Girls and Women (1986). It was one of the first scientific research studies of incestuous sexual abuse to be published. For it she received the C.Wright Mills Award in 1986. In 1993, she edited an anthology on pornography, Making Violence Sexy: Feminist Views on Pornography. Her 1994 book, Against Pornography: The Evidence of Harm, which includes 100 pornographic photos, was a study claiming that pornography consumption allegedly encourages men to rape and leads to increased incidents of rape. Further scientific research strongly challenged Diana's claim.

== Organizing the First International Tribunal on Crimes Against Women ==
Russell lobbied other feminists for two years and eventually was successful in organizing the first International Tribunal on Crimes against Women in Brussels, Belgium, in 1976. The conference which lasted for four days, in which individual women from different countries testified to their personal experiences of various forms of violence and oppressions because of their gender, was attended by 2,000 women from 40 countries. By the second day it had dissolved into disaster, as "radical activists were storming the stage one after another in an improvised free-for-fall".

Simone de Beauvoir in her introductory speech to the Tribunal said: "I salute the International Tribunal as the beginning of the radical decolonization of women." Later, Belgian feminist and journalist Nicole Van de Ven documented with Diana the event in a book, Crimes Against Women: The Proceedings of the International Tribunal (1976).

== Redefining and politicizing "femicide" ==
In 1976 Russell redefined 'femicide', as "the killing of females by males because they are female." At the International Tribunal on Crimes Against Women, she testified to numerous examples of lethal forms of male violence against women and girls from different cultures around the world. Russell's intention was to politicize the term, and bring attention to the misogyny driving these lethal crimes against women, which she said gender-neutral terms like murder don't do. Russell who was puzzled about the lack of response of women's groups in the United States to the use of the term 'femicide' continued to advocate the use of 'femicide' to women's groups in the United States and around the world. She explained that in order to deal with these extreme crimes against women, it is necessary to recognize that like race-based hate crimes, "Femicides are [also] lethal hate crimes", and that most killings of women by men are "extreme manifestations of male dominance and sexism."

In 1993, Russell initiated an organization called Women United Against Incest, which supports incest survivors with legal assistance against their perpetrators. Similarly, she created the first TV program in South Africa where incest survivors talk in person about their experiences.

Feminist movements in many countries in Latin America, as in Mexico, Guatemala, Costa Rica, Chile, and El Salvador among others, have adopted the use of Russell's politicized 'Femicide' and have successfully used it socially, politically and legally to address lethal violence against women in their respective countries. In 1992, she co-edited an anthology, Femicide: The Politics of Woman Killing.

== Other ==
In 1977, Russell became an associate of the Women's Institute for Freedom of the Press (WIFP). WIFP is an American nonprofit publishing organization. The organization works to increase communication between women and connect the public with forms of women-based media.

== Works ==
=== Books ===
- Russell, Diana E. H. (1974). The politics of rape: the victim's perspective. New York: Stein and Day. ISBN 9780812816570. OCLC 1165996.
- Russell, Diana E. H. (1975). Rebellion, revolution and armed force: comparative study of fifteen countries with special emphasis on Cuba and South Africa. New York: Academic Press. ISBN 9780127857459. OCLC 886393.
- Russell, Diana E .H.; van de Ven, Nicole (1976). Crimes against women: international tribunal proceedings. Millbrae, California: Les-Femmes Publishing. ISBN 9780890879214. OCLC 2464570. Conference proceedings.
- Russell, Diana E. H.; Star, Susan; Linden, Robin Ruth; Pagano, Darlene R. (1982). Against sadomasochism: a radical feminist analysis. East Palo Alto, California: Frog in the Well. ISBN 9780960362837. OCLC 7877113.
- Russell, Diana E. H. (1984). Sexual exploitation: rape, child sexual abuse, and workplace harassment. Beverly Hills, California: SAGE. ISBN 9780803923553. OCLC 10696523.
- Russell, Diana E. H. (1986). The secret trauma: incest in the lives of girls and women. New York: Basic Books. ISBN 9780465075966. OCLC 12974265.
- Russell, Diana E. H. (1989). Exposing nuclear phallacies. New York: Pergamon Press. ISBN 9780080364759. OCLC 18625199.
- Russell, Diana E. H. (1989). Lives of courage: women for a New South Africa. New York: Basic Books. ISBN 9780465041404. OCLC 19723691.
- Russell, Diana E. H. (1990). Rape in marriage. Bloomington, Indiana: Indiana University Press. ISBN 9780253205636. OCLC 8451646.
- Russell, Diana E. H.; Radford, Jill (1992). Femicide: the politics of woman killing. New York Toronto: Twayne Publishers. ISBN 9780805790283. OCLC 25367570. Front cover.
- Russell, Diana E. H. (September 1993). Against pornography: the evidence of harm. Berkeley, California: Russell Publishing. ISBN 9780963477613. OCLC 29988342.
- Russell, Diana E. H. (December 1993). Making violence sexy: feminist views on pornography. Buckingham: Open University Press. ISBN 9780335192007. OCLC 27106001.
- Russell, Diana E. H. (1997). Behind closed doors in White South Africa: incest survivors tell their stories. Jo Campling (consulting editor). New York: St Martin's Press. ISBN 9780312173753. OCLC 36066137.
- Russell, Diana E. H. (1998). Dangerous relationships: pornography, misogyny and rape. Thousand Oaks, California: SAGE. ISBN 9780761905257. OCLC 38257798.
- Russell, Diana E. H.; Bolen, Rebecca M. (2000). The epidemic of rape and child sexual abuse in the United States. Thousand Oaks, California: SAGE. ISBN 9780761903024. OCLC 43384742.
- Russell, Diana E. H.; Harmes, Roberta A. (2001). Femicide in global perspective. New York: Teachers College Press. ISBN 9780807740477. OCLC 45304762.

=== Chapters in books ===
- Russell, Diana E. H. (1983). "Research on how women experience the impact of pornography". In Copp, David; Wendell, Susan (eds.). Pornography and censorship. Buffalo, New York: Prometheus Books. ISBN 9780879751821.
- Russell, Diana E. H. (1992). "Nikki Craft: Inspiring protest: Introduction". In Russell, Diana E. H.; Radford, Jill (eds.). Femicide: the politics of woman killing. New York Toronto: Twayne Publishers. pp. 325–327. ISBN 9780805790283. Pdf.

See also:

"The incredible case of the Stack o' Wheat prints" by Nikki Craft pp. 327-331.
"The evidence of pain" by D. A. Clarke pp. 331–336.
"The rampage against Penthouse" by Melissa Farley pp. 339–345.

- Russell, Diana E. H. (2002). "Pornography causes violence". In Cothran, Helen (ed.). Pornography. Opposing Viewpoints series. San Diego, California: Greenhaven Press. pp. 48–51. ISBN 9780737707601. OCLC 45698745. Series editors: Mary E. Odom and Jody Clay-Warner.
- Russell, Diana E. H. (2011). "Russell's theory: exposure to child pornography as a cause of child sexual victimization". In Tankard Reist, Melinda; Bray, Abigail (eds.). Big Porn Inc.: exposing the harms of the global pornography industry. North Melbourne, Victoria: Spinifex Press. pp. 181–194. ISBN 9781876756895.
