= Non-science =

Area of study that is not scientific

A non-science is an area of study that is not scientific, especially one that is not a natural science or a social science that is an object of scientific inquiry. In this model, history, art, and religion are all examples of non-sciences.

== Classifying knowledge ==
Since the 17th century, some writers have used the word science to exclude some areas of studies, such as the arts and the liberal arts. The word nonscience, to describe non-scientific academic disciplines, was first used in the middle of the 19th century.

In some cases, it can be difficult to identify exact boundaries between science and non-science. The demarcation problem is the study of the difficulties in determining whether certain fields of study, near the boundaries of science and non-science, should be considered as one or the other. No single test has yet been devised that can clearly separate science from non-science, but some factors, taken as a whole and evaluated over time, are commonly used. In the view of Thomas Kuhn, these factors include the desire of scientists to investigate a question as if it were a puzzle. Kuhn's view of science is also focused on the process of scientific inquiry, rather than the result.

Boundary-work is the process of advocating for a desired outcome in the process of classifying fields of study that are near the borders. The rewards associated with winning a particular classification suggest that the boundary between science and non-science is socially constructed and ideologically motivated rather than representing a stark natural difference between science and non-science. The belief that scientific knowledge (e.g., biology) is more valuable than other forms of knowledge (e.g., ethics) is called scientism.

== Areas of non-science ==
Non-science includes all areas of study that are not science. Non-science encompasses all of the humanities, including:

- history, including the history of science,
- the language arts, such as literature and language learning,
- philosophy, ethics, and religion, and
- art, including music, performing arts, fine arts, and crafts.

The philosopher Martin Mahner proposed calling these academic fields the parasciences, to distinguish them from disreputable forms of non-science, such as pseudoscience.

Non-sciences offer information about the meaning of life, human values, the human condition, and ways of interacting with other people, including studies of cultures, morality and ethics.

== Areas of disagreement ==
Some philosophers see knowledge as the product of overlapping communities of knowledge. Others try to find a sharp division between science and non-science.

Philosophers disagree about whether areas of study involving abstract concepts, such as pure mathematics, are scientific or non-scientific.

Interdisciplinary studies may cover knowledge-generating work that includes both scientific and non-scientific studies. Archaeology is an example of a field that borrows from both the natural sciences and history.

Fields of inquiry may change status over time. For many centuries, alchemy was accepted as scientific: it produced some useful information, and it supported experiments and open inquiry in the pursuit of understanding the physical world. Since the 20th century, it has been considered a pseudoscience. Modern chemistry, which developed out of alchemy, is considered a major natural science.

== Alternative systems ==
Some philosophers, such as Paul Feyerabend, object to the effort to classify knowledge into science and non-science. The distinction is artificial, as there is little or nothing that ties together all of the bodies of knowledge that are called "sciences".

Some systems of organizing knowledge separate systematic knowledge from non-systematic methods of knowing or learning something, such as personal experiences, intuition, and innate knowledge. Wissenschaft is a broad concept that encompasses reliable knowledge without making a distinction between subject area. The Wissenschaft concept is more useful than the distinction between science and non-science in distinguishing between knowledge and pseudo-knowledge, as the errors made in all forms of pseudo-scholarship, from pseudohistory to pseudoscience, are similar. This Wissenschaft concept is used in the 2006 list of Fields of Science and Technology published by the Organisation for Economic Co-operation and Development, which defines "science and technology" as encompassing all humanistic disciplines, including religion and fine art.

== See also ==
- Boundary object – an item, such as an animal hide, that can be legitimately studied in different ways by different fields of study
- Branches of science
- Liberal arts
- Hard and soft science
- Carper's fundamental ways of knowing
