= Stephen Brookfield =

British academic (born 1949)

- Born: 1949 (age 76–77); Liverpool, England
- Awards: Cyril O. Houle World Award for Literature in Adult Education (six times)

Academic background
- Education: University of Leicester, UK
- Thesis: Independent Adult Learning (1980)

Academic work
- Institutions: University of St. Thomas, Minneapolis-St. Paul, Minnesota
- Main interests: Adult education
- Website: Official

Stephen Brookfield (born 1949 in Liverpool, England) is a scholar in adult education who has held positions at the University of British Columbia, Columbia University, Harvard University University of Saint Thomas and Antioch University. He is currently adjunct professor at Columbia University, and emeritus professor at the University of St. Thomas.

== Education ==
Brookfield earned his Ph.D. from the University of Leicester in 1980 and wrote a thesis on independent adult learning.

== Career ==
In his teaching career, Brookfield has worked in England, Canada, Australia, and the United States, teaching in a variety of college settings. He has written nineteen books on adult learning, adult teaching, critical thinking, discussion methods, critical theory as well as critical pedagogy and teaching race. His overall project is to help adults learn to think critically about the dominant ideologies they have internalized and how these can be challenged. Influenced by the Frankfurt School of Critical Theory and American Pragmatism he has written extensively on how to use methods of critical reflection and discussion based teaching to uncover ideologies such as white supremacy and patriarchy. His twenty first book titled Teaching Well: Understanding Key Dynamics of Learning Centered Classrooms was published in 2023 by Routledge, co-authored by Juergen Rudolph & Shannon Tan. ''Becoming a White Anti-Racist: A Practical Guide to Educators, Leaders and Activists (co-authored with Mary Hess) was published by Stylus Publishers in 2021. Many of his ideas are influential across the discipline of adult education and beyond. In particular, his Four Lenses of Critical Reflection suggest that educators should continuously reflect on their own practice through four lenses: their own experiences, the perspectives of their students, feedback from their colleagues, and the ideas contained in scholarship. Applying these lenses to our practice can help us become more rounded, critically reflective practitioners. In Recent years Brookfield has focused much of his scholarship on issues relating to white supremacy and how this intersects with adult education and critical reflection. This work particularly emphasizes the importance of addressing power and systemic racism in our institutions and classrooms many of which remain predominantly white.

== Awards ==
Brookfield has three honorary doctor of letters degrees; from the University System of New Hampshire in 1991, from Concordia University, St. Paul (St. Paul, Minnesota) in 2003, and from Muhlenberg College in 2010. He won the Cyril O. Houle World Award for Literature in Adult Education six times (in 1986, 1989, 1996, 2005, 2011 and 2012), as well as the 1986 Imogene Okes Award for Outstanding Research in Adult Education, all awarded by the American Association for Adult and Continuing Education. At the University of St. Thomas he has won the John Ireland Presidential Award for Outstanding Achievement as a Teacher/Scholar award for as an exemplary scholar-teacher and the university's Diversity Leadership Teaching and Research Award. His work has been translated into several languages including Korean, German, Finnish, Japanese, Danish, Polish, Persian and Chinese. In 2001 he received the Leadership Award from the Association for Continuing Higher Education (ACHE) for "extraordinary contributions to the general field of continuing education on a national and international level", and in 2008 he was awarded the Morris T. Keeton Award for Contributions to Adult and Experiential learning, awarded by the Council for Academic and Experiential Learning. In 2009 he was inducted into the International Adult Education Hall of Fame. He won the 2014 Philip E. Frandson Award for Literature awarded by the University Professional and Continuing Education Association for his book Powerful Techniques for Teaching Adults.

== Selected bibliography ==
=== Books ===
- Brookfield, Stephen (1980). Independent adult learning (PhD thesis). University of Leicester, UK. hdl:2381/10432. OCLC 57138050.
- —— (1984). Adult learners, adult education and the community. ISBN 978-0-335-10409-3.
- —— (1985). Self-directed learning: from theory to practice. ISBN 978-0-87589-743-1.
- —— (1986). Understanding and facilitating adult learning: a comprehensive analysis of principles and effective practices. ISBN 9781555423551.
- —— (1987). Developing critical thinkers: challenging adults to explore alternative ways of thinking and acting. ISBN 9781555420550.
- —— (1988). Training educators of adults: the theory and practice of graduate adult education. ISBN 978-0-415-00564-7.
- —— (1988). Learning democracy: Eduard Lindeman on adult education and social change. ISBN 978-0-7099-5017-2.
- —— (2015). The Skillful teacher: on trust, technique and responsiveness in the classroom (3rd ed.). ISBN 9780787980665.
- —— (2017). Becoming a critically reflective teacher. ISBN 9780787901318.
- ——; Preskill, Stephen (2005). Discussion as a way of teaching: tools and techniques for democratic classrooms. ISBN 9780787944582.
- —— (2005). The Power of Critical Theory: Liberating Adult Learning and Teaching. ISBN 9780787956011.
- ——; Hess, Mary (2008). Teaching reflectively in theological contexts: promises and contradictions (PDF). ISBN 978-1-57524-284-2.
- ——; Preskill, Stephen (2009). Learning as a way of leading: lessons from the struggle for social justice. ISBN 9780787978075.
- ——; Sheared, Vanessa; Scipio III, Colin; Peterson, Elizabeth; Bailey, Juanita Johnson (2010). Handbook of race and adult education. ISBN 9780470381762.
- ——; Holst, John (2010). Radicalizing learning: adult education for a just world. ISBN 9780787998257.
- —— (2011). Teaching for critical thinking: helping students question their assumptions. ISBN 9780470889343.
- —— (2013). Powerful techniques for teaching adults. ISBN 9781118017005.
- ——; James, Alison (2014). Engaging imagination: helping students become creative and reflective thinkers. ISBN 978-1-118-40947-3.
- ——; Preskill, Stephen (2016). The discussion book: 50 great ways to get people talking. ISBN 978-1-100-49715-0.
- Brookfield, Stephen Teaching Race: Helping Students Unmask and Challenge Racism. 2018. ISBN 978-1-119-37442-8
- https://styluspub.presswarehouse.com/browse/book/9781620368596/Becoming-a-White-Antiracist Becoming a White Antiracist: A Practical Guide for Educators, Leaders and Activists. Stephen Brookfield and Mary Hess. Sterling, VA: Stylus Publishing, 2021.

https://www.taylorfrancis.com/books/mono/10.4324/9781003447467/teaching-well-stephen-brookfield-j%C3%BCrgen-rudolph-shannon-tan

=== Chapters in books ===
- Disrupting Whiteness: The Productive Disturbance of George Yancy's Work on White Identity & the White Gaze. In, K. Ducey (Ed.). George Yancy: A Critical Reader. Lanham, MD: Rowman & Littlefield (2020) Forthcoming.
- Using a Pedagogy of Narrative Disclosure to Uncover White Supremacy. In, A. Mandell & Elana Michelson (Eds.). Adult Education in the Age of Trump and Brexit. San Francisco: Jossey-Bass (2020)
- Uncovering White Supremacy" In, G. Yancy (Ed.). [https://www.routledge.com/Educating-for-Critical-Consciousness/Yancy/p/book/9781138363366 Educating for Critical Consciousness]. New York: Routledge (2019)
- Critical Thinking and Its Limitations: Can We Think Our Way Out of White Supremacy?" In, E. Minnich and M. Patton (Eds.). [https://rowman.com/ISBN/9781538131534/Thought-Work-Thinking-Action-and-the-Fate-of-the-World Thought Work: Learning to Think for Love of the World]. Lanham, MD: Rowman and Littlefield (2020).
- Transformative Learning and the Awareness of White Supremacy." Phronesis, Vol. 7, No. 3 2019.
- Repressive Tolerance and the 'Management' of Diversity" In, V. Wang (Ed.). Critical Theory and Transformative Learning. Hershey, PA: Information Science Publishing (2018)
- White Teachers in Diverse Classrooms: Using Narrative to Address Teaching About Racial Dynamics." In, C. Scott & J. Sims (Eds.) Developing Workforce Diversity Programs, Curriculum and Degrees in Higher Education, Hershey, PA: IGI Publishing (2016)

=== Journal articles ===
- * Why White Instructors Should Explore their Racial Identity" Adult Literacy Education: The International Journal of Literacy, Language and Numeracy. Vol. 1, No. 2, 2019.
- * Killing White Innocence: A Review of George Yancy's Backlash: What Happens When We Talk Honestly About Race in America. (Tikkun, 2018)
- Brookfield, S.D. "Racializing the Discourse of Adult Education." International Journal of Adult Vocational Education and Training, Vol. 5, No. 4, 2014.
- Teaching Our Own Racism: Incorporating Personal Narratives of Whiteness into Anti-Racist Practice," Adult Learning, 25/3, 2014

== See also ==
- Reflective practice: Brookfield 1998
