= Against Sadomasochism =

1982 radical feminist anthology

Against Sadomasochism: A Radical Feminist Analysis
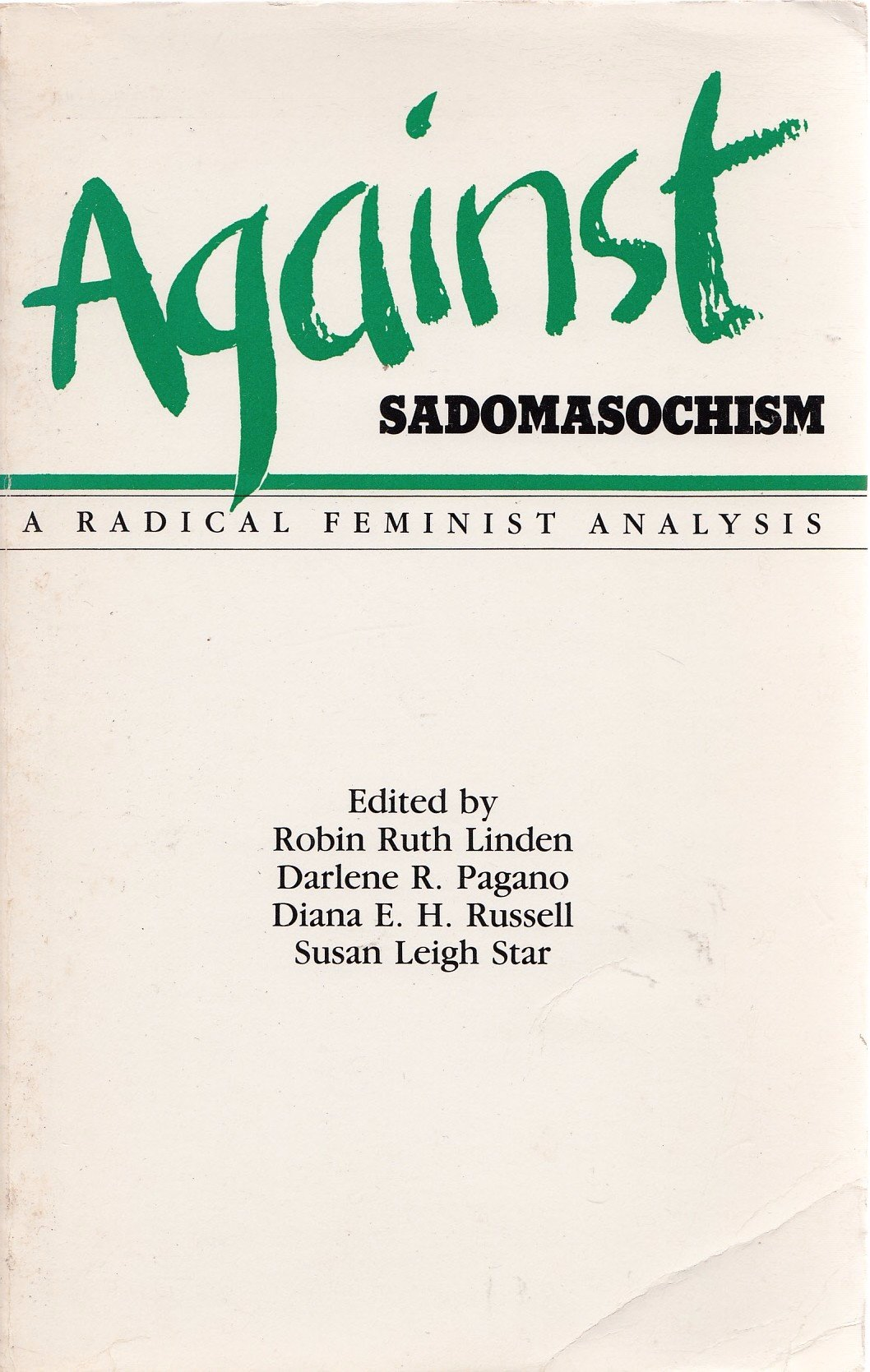
- Cover of the first edition
- Editors: Robin Ruth Linden; Darlene R. Pagano; Diana E. H. Russell; Susan Leigh Star
- Language: English
- Subject: Sadomasochism
- Publisher: Frog in the Well
- Publication date: 1982
- Publication place: United States
- Media type: Print (paperback)
- Pages: 212
- ISBN: 0-9603628-3-5
- OCLC: 7877113

Against Sadomasochism: A Radical Feminist Analysis is a 1982 radical feminist anthology edited by Robin Ruth Linden, Darlene R. Pagano, Diana E. H. Russell, and Susan Leigh Star. The authors critique sadomasochism and BDSM, with most identifying sadomasochism as rooted in "patriarchal sexual ideology".

== Summary ==
The compilation includes essays by a variety of radical feminists such as Alice Walker, Robin Morgan, Kathleen Barry, Diana E. H. Russell, Susan Leigh Star, Ti-Grace Atkinson, John Stoltenberg, Sarah Lucia Hoagland, Darlene Pagano, Susan Griffin, Cheri Lesh, and Judith Butler. Butler, credited as "Judy Butler", criticizes Samois in their essay "Lesbian S&M: The Politics of Dis-Illusion". Several other essays in the anthology also criticize it. The anthology also includes an interview between Audre Lorde and Susan Leigh Star. The essays express opposition to sadomasochism from a number of different viewpoints. Three pieces, a letter by Alice Walker, the interview with Audre Lorde, and a conversation between Karen Sims, Darlene Pagano, and Rose Mason, criticize the movement as insensitive to the experiences of black women, particularly criticizing "master/slave" relationships. Susan Leigh Star criticizes the use of swastikas and other Nazi imagery by some BDSM practitioners as antisemitic and racist. Marissa Jonel and Elizabeth Harris's articles are accounts of personal experiences with sadomasochism, and Paula Tiklicorect and Melissa Bay Mathis use satire in their pieces. Susan Griffin's article, reprinted from her book Pornography and Silence with an introduction, criticizes Story of O, the book from which Samois took their name. Griffin argues that Story of O shows "how a pornographic society turns a woman's heart against herself".

== Reception ==
In a review for lesbian feminist magazine Off Our Backs, Carol Anne Douglas highly recommended the book, praising its arguments as convincing and calling parts of the book "moving". Charles Moser wrote a negative review for The Journal of Sex Research, admitting that the essays are "well-written" but nonetheless calling the book "infuriating". Moser compares the feminist arguments against sadomasochism in the book to religious arguments against homosexuality, saying both of these cause unnecessary guilt.

== See also ==
- Feminist views on BDSM
