= Information infrastructure =

Information architecture

An information infrastructure is defined by Ole Hanseth (2002) as "a shared, evolving, open, standardized, and heterogeneous installed base" and by Pironti (2006) as all of the people, processes, procedures, tools, facilities, and technology which support the creation, use, transport, storage, and destruction of information.

== History ==
The notion of information infrastructures, introduced in the 1990s and refined during the following decade, has proven quite fruitful to the information systems (IS) field. It changed the perspective from organizations to networks and from systems to infrastructure, allowing for a global and emergent perspective on information systems. Information infrastructure is a technical structure of an organizational form, an analytical perspective or a semantic network.

The concept of information infrastructure (II) was introduced in the early 1990s, first as a political initiative, later as a more specific concept in IS research. For the IS research community, an important inspiration was Hughes' (1983) accounts of large technical systems, analyzed as socio-technical power structures. Information infrastructure are typically different from the previous generations of "large technological system" because these digital sociotechnical systems are considered generative, meaning they allow new users to connect with or even appropriate the system.

Information infrastructure, as a theory, has been used to frame a number of extensive case studies, and in particular to develop an alternative approach to IS design: "Infrastructures should rather be built by establishing working local solutions supporting local practices which subsequently are linked together rather than by defining universal standards and subsequently implementing them". It has later been developed into a full design theory, focusing on the growth of an installed base.

Information infrastructures include the Internet, health systems and corporate systems. It is also consistent to include innovations such as Facebook, LinkedIn and MySpace as excellent examples.

== Concepts ==
Bowker has described several key terms and concepts that are enormously helpful for analyzing information infrastructure: imbrication, bootstrapping, figure/ground, and a short discussion of infrastructural inversion. "Imbrication" is an analytic concept that helps to ask questions about historical data. "Bootstrapping" is the idea that infrastructure must already exist in order to exist (2011).

== Definitions ==
"Technological and non-technological elements that are linked" (Hanseth & Monteiro 1997).

"Information infrastructures can, as formative contexts, shape not only the work routines, but also the ways people look at practices, consider them 'natural' and give them their overarching character of necessity. Infrastructure becomes an essential factor shaping the taken-for-grantedness of organizational practices" (Ciborra & Hanseth 1998).

"The technological and human components, networks, systems, and processes that contribute to the functioning of the health information system" (Braa et al. 2007).

"The set of organizational practices, technical infrastructure and social norms that collectively provide for the smooth operation of scientific work at a distance (Edwards et al. 2007).

"A shared, evolving, heterogeneous installed base of IT capabilities developed on open and standardized interfaces" (Hanseth & Lyytinen 2006).

== Theories ==
=== Dimensions ===
According to Star and Ruhleder, there are 8 dimensions of information infrastructures.

1. Embeddedness
2. Transparency
3. Reach or scope
4. Learned as part of membership
5. Links with conventions of practice
6. Embodiment of standards
7. Built on an installed base
8. Becomes visible upon breakdown

=== As a public policy ===
Presidential Chair and Professor of Information Studies at the University of California, Los Angeles, Christine L. Borgman argues information infrastructures, like all infrastructures, are "subject to public policy". In the United States, public policy defines information infrastructures as the "physical and cyber-based systems essential to the minimum operations of the economy and government" and connected by information technologies.

== Global Information Infrastructure (GII) ==
Borgman says governments, businesses, communities, and individuals can work together to create a global information infrastructure which links "the world's telecommunication and computer networks together" and would enable the transmission of "every conceivable information and communication application."

Currently, the Internet is the default global information infrastructure.

== Regional information infrastructure ==
=== Asia ===
The Asia-Pacific Economic Cooperation Telecommunications and Information Working Group (TEL) Program of Asian for Information and Communications Infrastructure.

==== Southeast Asia ====
Association of South East Asian Nations, e-ASEAN Framework Agreement of 2000.

=== North America ===
==== United States ====
National Information Infrastructure Act of 1993 National Information Infrastructure (NII).

==== Canada ====
The National Research Council established CA*net in 1989 and the network connecting "all provincial nodes" was operational in 1990. The Canadian Network for the Advancement of Research, Industry and Education(CANARIE) was established in 1992 and CA*net was upgraded to a T1 connection in 1993 and T3 in 1995. By 2000, "the commercial basis for Canada's information infrastructure" was established, and the government ended its role in the project.

=== Europe ===
In 1994, the European Union proposed the European Information Infrastructure.: European Information Infrastructure has evolved furthermore thanks to Martin Bangemann report and projects eEurope 2003+, eEurope 2005 and iIniciaive 2010.

=== Africa ===
In 1995, American Vice President Al Gore asked USAID to help improve Africa's connection to the global information infrastructure.

The USAID Leland Initiative (LI) was designed from June to September 1995, and implemented in on 29 September 1995. The Initiative was "a five-year $15 million US Government effort to support sustainable development" by bringing "full Internet connectivity" to approximately 20 African nations.

The initiative had three strategic objectives:

1. Creating and Enabling Policy Environment – to "reduce barriers to open connectivity".
2. Creating Sustainable Supply of Internet Services – help build the hardware and industry need for "full Internet connectivity".
3. Enhancing Internet Use for Sustainable Development – improve the ability of African nations to use these infrastructures.

== See also ==
- Data infrastructure
- Information ecology
- Information science
- IT infrastructure
