= Carper's fundamental ways of knowing =

In healthcare, Carper's fundamental ways of knowing is a typology that attempts to classify the different sources from which knowledge and beliefs in professional practice (originally specifically nursing) can be or have been derived. It was proposed by Barbara A. Carper, a professor at the College of Nursing at Texas Woman's University, in 1978.

The typology identifies four fundamental "patterns of knowing":

Empirical
Factual knowledge from science, or other external sources, that can be empirically verified.
Personal
Knowledge and attitudes derived from personal self-understanding and empathy, including imagining one's self in the patient's position.
Ethical
Attitudes and knowledge derived from an ethical framework, including an awareness of moral questions and choices.
Aesthetic
Awareness of the immediate situation, seated in immediate practical action; including awareness of the patient and their circumstances as uniquely individual, and of the combined wholeness of the situation. (Aesthetic in this sense is used to mean "relating to the here and now", from the Greek αἰσθάνομαι (aisthanomai), meaning "I perceive, feel, sense"; the reference is not to the consideration of beauty, art and taste).

The emphasis on different ways of knowing is presented as a tool for generating clearer and more complete thinking and learning about experiences, and broader self-integration of classroom education. As such it helped crystallize Johns' (1995) framework for reflective investigation to develop reflective practice.

The typology has been seen as leading a reaction against over-emphasis on just empirically derived knowledge, so called "scientific nursing", by emphasising that attitudes and actions that are perhaps more personal and more intuitive are centrally important too, and equally fit for discussion.
