= Marte Meo =

Educational counseling method

Marte Meo (Latin "by own power") is a method of educational counselling.

It was developed in the late 1970s and early 1980s by the Dutch educational counsellor Maria Aarts. She recognised the difficulties in explaining scientific observations of a child's problems to parents and other educators, as they are often unable to relate to the pedagogic jargon and identify the relevance of these insights in everyday-life situations.

She technique devised was to document typical interactions between a child and an educator by video and later these video(s) are watched by the parents or other educators to enable discussion together. The aim of this was to enable the strengths and weaknesses of both children and educators in their interaction to be more easily recognised, which in turn aims at helping both to gain the power to solve educational issues themselves. Enhanced communication becomes the most important instrument in achieving this.

In 1987, Maria Aarts founded the Marte Meo organisation, which aimed at teaching educational counsellors how to apply the Marte Meo method.

Marte Meo is being practiced in the Netherlands, Scandinavia, France, Ireland and India. In these countries, it is regarded as effective, cheap and pragmatic.

It is refuted by therapeutic experts the United States, where the method is regarded as too time-consuming considering that there are other alternatives in such situations.
