= Boundary object =

Sociology of information science

In sociology and science and technology studies, a boundary object is information, such as specimens, field notes, and maps, used in different ways by different communities for collaborative work through scales. Boundary objects are plastic, interpreted differently across communities but with enough immutable content (i.e., common identity across social words and contexts) to maintain integrity.

The concept was introduced by Susan Leigh Star and James R. Griesemer in a 1989 publication (p. 393):

Boundary objects are objects which are both plastic enough to adapt to local needs and the constraints of the several parties employing them, yet robust enough to maintain a common identity across sites. They are weakly structured in common use, and become strongly structured in individual-site use. They may be abstract or concrete. They have different meanings in different social worlds but their structure is common enough to more than one world to make them recognizable, a means of translation. The creation and management of boundary objects is key in developing and maintaining coherence across intersecting social worlds.

In their article, Star and Griesemer describe the importance of boundary objects and methods standardization in the development of the Berkeley Museum of Vertebrate Zoology. Boundary objects can be abstract or concrete (e.g., digital technologies or abstract ideas); so in this case some of the boundary objects that they list include specimens, field notes, and maps of particular territories. These objects interact with members of various social groups (including amateur collectors and museum professionals) but are used to very different ends by each (p. 408). These differing interpretations represent the "interpretive flexibility" of boundary objects.

== Applications ==
This concept has since been widely cited and the concept of a boundary object has been adopted in computer science (particularly computer supported cooperative work), information science, and management, particularly when considering cross-disciplinary work and collaboration, either within one organization or with the boundary object helping to focus the efforts of multiple organizations. Geoffrey Bowker and Star developed the concept further in the book Sorting Things Out: Classification and Its Consequences.

Boundary objects are said to allow coordination without consensus as they can allow an actor's local understanding to be reframed in the context of a wider collective activity. Similarly, Etienne Wenger describes boundary objects as entities that can link communities together as they allow different groups to collaborate on a common task.

Charlotte Lee has extended the concept of the boundary object to consider periods of unstandardized and destabilized organization where objects are transient and changing, which she coins as "boundary negotiating artifacts." Similarly, Kertcher and Coslor focused on the early period of boundary objects prior to stabilization using the example of grid computing, finding this early period to be a frustrating time for cross-disciplinary collaborators, in part because it required direct negotiation across disciplinary work boundaries, rather than being able to work separately at the edge of the shared boundary object, a situation that exacerbated cross-disciplinary frictions.

Alex Juhasz and Anne Balsamo evoke the idea of learning objects (drawn from contemporary learning theory) to develop the concept of "boundary objects that learn," or BOTLs. This understanding of boundary objects acknowledges their role in the meaning-making process and in communication across social groups. However, it also emphasizes the fact that human users of boundary objects, especially those with access to digital technologies, can modify those objects to meet their needs.

== Political implications ==
Kimble, Grenier and Goglio-Primard (2010) criticise the notion of boundary objects that is usually found in the literature as being too mechanical and ignoring the effect of intergroup politics and local conditions. They argue that boundary objects need to be seen in context of the motivations of the people that choose the object as well as their communicative role.

Isto Huvila, using the example of archaeological reports, argues that the creation of boundary objects is always to some degree an expression of hegemony. As such, boundary objects cannot be viewed as politically neutral or necessarily consensual.

== See also ==
- Boundary-work – Study of boundaries between disciplines
- Trading zones (metaphor) – Metaphor applied to collaborations in science
