= Geoffrey C. Bowker =

American academic

- Occupations: University teacher, computer scientist
- Employers: Keele University; University of California, Irvine; University of Pittsburgh
- Spouse: Susan Leigh Star
- Awards: Fellow of the American Association for the Advancement of Science (2010); John Desmond Bernal Prize (2024); Ludwik Fleck Prize

Geoffrey C. Bowker is Chancellor's Professor Emeritus of Informatics at the University of California, Irvine after retiring in 2021. He moved to UCI at the start of 2012, having held the positions of Professor and Senior Scholar in Cyberscholarship at the University of Pittsburgh School of Information. Prior to that, Bowker was executive director and Regis and Dianne McKenna Professor at the Center for Science, Technology and Society at Santa Clara University. Previously, Bowker was chair of the Department of Communication at the University of California, San Diego and has held appointments at the University of Illinois Urbana-Champaign.

With his late partner Susan Leigh Star, he has devoted much of his career to examining the values embedded within sociotechnical infrastructures such as databases, visualization strategies, and science and engineering standards. They also discuss the human instinct to classify things.

With Star and Helen Nissenbaum, he founded the NSF-funded Values in Design workshop and research project series to bring together scholars examining these issues across broader sites of study and across disciplines.

== Selected works ==
- Science on the Run: Information Management and Industrial Geophysics at Schlumberger, 1920-1940, MIT Press, 1994. ISBN 978-0-262-02367-2
- Sorting Things Out: Classification and its Consequences, MIT Press, 1999 (co-authored with Susan Leigh Star). ISBN 978-0-262-52295-3
- Memory Practices in the Sciences, MIT Press, 2005. (awarded 2006 ASIS&T Best Information Science Book Award) ISBN 978-0-262-52489-6
- Understanding Infrastructure: Dynamics, Tensions, and Design, National Science Foundation, 2007 (co-authored with Paul N. Edwards, Steven J. Jackson, and Cory P. Knobel).
- "The Ends of Computing", Ends of Knowledge, Bloomsbury Publishing, 2023. ISBN 978-1-350-24230-2
- "Life at the Femtosecond", Media Infrastructures and the Politics of Digital Time, Routledge, 2025. ISBN 978-1-003-69951-4
