= Demarcation problem =

Philosophical question of how to distinguish between science and non-science

In philosophy of science and epistemology, the demarcation problem is the question of how to distinguish between science and non-science. It also examines the boundaries between science, pseudoscience and other products of human activity, like art and literature and beliefs. The debate continues after more than two millennia of dialogue among philosophers of science and scientists in various fields. The debate has consequences for what can be termed "scientific" in topics such as education and public policy.

== Ancient natural philosophy ==
The historical roots of the demarcation problem predate the emergence of modern science during the Scientific Revolution. In ancient Greece, inquiry into the natural world was commonly pursued through natural philosophy, which differed in its methods and intellectual context from modern scientific practice. Greek natural philosophers and medical practitioners nevertheless sought to distinguish their explanations of natural phenomena from mythological and other traditional accounts. These efforts anticipated later philosophical debates about the nature and distinguishing characteristics of scientific knowledge.

Aristotle described at length what was involved in having scientific knowledge of something. To be scientific, he said, one must deal with causes, one must use logical demonstration, and one must identify the universals which 'inhere' in the particulars of sense. But above all, to have science one must have apodictic certainty. It is the last feature which, for Aristotle, most clearly distinguished the scientific way of knowing.

— Larry Laudan, "The Demise of the Demarcation Problem" (1983)

G. E. R. Lloyd noted that there was a sense in which the groups engaged in various forms of inquiry into nature attempt to "legitimate their own positions", laying "claim to a new kind of wisdom ... that purported to yield superior enlightenment, even superior practical effectiveness". Medical writers of the Hippocratic tradition maintained that their discussions were based on demonstration of logical necessity, a theme developed by Aristotle in his Posterior Analytics. One element of this polemic for science was an insistence on a clear and unequivocal presentation of arguments, rejecting the imagery, analogy, and myth of the old wisdom. Some of their claimed naturalistic explanations of phenomena have been found to be quite fanciful, with little reliance on actual observations.

Cicero's De Divinatione implicitly used five criteria of scientific demarcation that are also used by modern philosophers of science.

== The Scientific Revolution ==
The emergence of modern science during the Scientific Revolution contributed to the development of new methods and standards for establishing reliable knowledge about the natural world. These developments provided an important context for later philosophical attempts to distinguish scientific inquiry from other forms of knowledge and belief.

== Logical positivism ==
Logical positivism, which emerged in the 1920s, approached the demarcation problem through the distinction between empirically verifiable statements and metaphysical claims. Associated particularly with the Vienna Circle, logical positivists developed versions of the verification principle, according to which the empirical meaningfulness of a statement depended on its being verifiable, at least in principle, through observation or experience.

A. J. Ayer, a British philosopher influenced by the Vienna Circle, developed a version of verificationism in which statements purporting to describe a reality beyond possible empirical experience lacked cognitive meaning. He argued that metaphysical statements were not merely unsupported or false, but failed to satisfy his criterion of empirical meaningfulness. In Language, Truth and Logic (1936), Ayer developed a criterion of empirical meaning based on verificationism. He distinguished between strong verification, in which a proposition's truth could be conclusively established, and weak verification, which required a less conclusive connection to observation. His proposed criterion was subsequently revised in response to philosophical objections.

For the logical positivists, the distinction between empirically meaningful and metaphysical statements was closely related to the distinction between science and non-science. However, this approach addressed a different question from that of distinguishing science from pseudoscience. As philosopher Sven Ove Hansson explains, the verificationist proposals were primarily concerned with demarcating science from metaphysics, rather than identifying practices that falsely claim scientific status.

== Falsifiability ==
Karl Popper considered demarcation as a major problem of the philosophy of science. Popper articulates the problem of demarcation as:

The problem of finding a criterion which would enable us to distinguish between the empirical sciences on the one hand, and mathematics and logic as well as 'metaphysical' systems on the other, I call the problem of demarcation."

Falsifiability is the demarcation criterion proposed by Popper as opposed to verificationism: "statements or systems of statements, in order to be ranked as scientific, must be capable of conflicting with possible, or conceivable observations."

=== Against verifiability ===
Popper rejected solutions to the problem of demarcation that are grounded in inductive reasoning, and so rejected logical-positivist responses to the problem of demarcation. He argued that logical-positivists want to create a demarcation between the metaphysical and the empirical because they believe that empirical claims are meaningful and metaphysical ones are not. Unlike the Vienna Circle, Popper stated that his proposal was not a criterion of "meaningfulness".

Popper's demarcation criterion has been criticized both for excluding legitimate science ... and for giving some pseudosciences the status of being scientific ... According to Larry Laudan (1983, 121), it "has the untoward consequence of countenancing as 'scientific' every crank claim which makes ascertainably false assertions". Astrology, rightly taken by Popper as an unusually clear example of a pseudoscience, has in fact been tested and thoroughly refuted ... Similarly, the major threats to the scientific status of psychoanalysis, another of his major targets, do not come from claims that it is untestable but from claims that it has been tested and failed the tests.

— Sven Ove Hansson, The Stanford Encyclopedia of Philosophy, "Science and Pseudo-Science"

Popper argued that the Humean induction problem shows that there is no way to make meaningful universal statements on the basis of any number of empirical observations. Therefore, empirical statements are no more "verifiable" than metaphysical statements.

This creates a problem for the demarcation the positivists wanted to define between the empirical and the metaphysical. By their very own "verifiability criterion", Popper argued, the empirical is subsumed into the metaphysical, and the demarcation between the two becomes non-existent.

=== The solution of falsifiability ===
In Popper's later work, he stated that falsifiability is both a necessary and sufficient criterion for demarcation. He described falsifiability as a property of "the logical structure of sentences and classes of sentences", so that a statement's scientific or non-scientific status does not change over time. This has been summarized as a statement being falsifiable "if and only if it logically contradicts some (empirical) sentence that describes a logically possible event that it would be logically possible to observe".

== Kuhnian postpositivism ==
Thomas Kuhn, an American historian and philosopher of science, is often associated with what has been termed postpositivism or postempiricism. In his 1962 book The Structure of Scientific Revolutions, Kuhn divided the process of doing science into two different endeavors, which he termed normal science and extraordinary science (sometimes known as "revolutionary science"), the latter of which introduces a new "paradigm" that solves new problems while continuing to provide solutions to the problems solved by the preceding paradigm.

Finally, and this is for now my main point, a careful look at the scientific enterprise suggests that it is normal science, in which Sir Karl's sort of testing does not occur, rather than extraordinary science which most nearly distinguishes science from other enterprises. If a demarcation criterion exists (we must not, I think, seek a sharp or decisive one), it may lie just in that part of science which Sir Karl ignores.

— Thomas S. Kuhn, "Logic of Discovery or Psychology of Research?", in Criticism and the Growth of Knowledge (1970), edited by Imre Lakatos and Alan Musgrave

Kuhn's view of demarcation is most clearly expressed in his comparison of astronomy with astrology. Since antiquity, astronomy has been a puzzle-solving activity and therefore a science. If an astronomer's prediction failed, then this was a puzzle that he could hope to solve for instance with more measurements or with adjustments of the theory. In contrast, the astrologer had no such puzzles since in that discipline "particular failures did not give rise to research puzzles, for no man, however skilled, could make use of them in a constructive attempt to revise the astrological tradition" ... Therefore, according to Kuhn, astrology has never been a science.

— Sven Ove Hansson, "Science and Pseudo-Science", in the Stanford Encyclopedia of Philosophy

Popper criticized Kuhn's demarcation criterion, saying that astrologers are engaged in puzzle solving, and that therefore Kuhn's criterion recognized astrology as a science. He stated that Kuhn's criterion results in a "major disaster ... [the] replacement of a rational criterion of science by a sociological one".

== Feyerabend and Lakatos ==
Kuhn's work largely called into question Popper's demarcation, and emphasized the human, subjective quality of scientific change. Paul Feyerabend was concerned that the very question of demarcation was insidious: science itself had no need of a demarcation criterion, but instead some philosophers were seeking to justify a special position of authority from which science could dominate public discourse. Feyerabend argued that science is not in fact special in terms of either its logic or method, and no claim to special authority made by scientists can be sustained. He argued that, within the history of scientific practice, no rule or method can be found that has not been violated or circumvented at some point in order to advance scientific knowledge. Both Imre Lakatos and Feyerabend suggest that science is not an autonomous form of reasoning, but is inseparable from the larger body of human thought and inquiry.

== Thagard ==
Paul R. Thagard proposed another set of principles to try to overcome these difficulties, and argued that it is important for society to find a way of doing so. According to Thagard's method, a theory is not scientific if it satisfies two conditions:

1. The theory has been less progressive than alternative theories over a long period of time, and has many unsolved problems; and...
2. The community of practitioners makes little attempt to develop the theory towards solutions of the problems, shows no concern for attempts to evaluate the theory in relation to others, and is selective in considering confirmations and disconfirmations.

Thagard specified that sometimes theories will spend some time as merely "unpromising" before they truly deserve the title of pseudoscience. He cited astrology as an example: it was stagnant compared to advances in physics during the 17th century, and only later became "pseudoscience" in the advent of alternative explanations provided by psychology during the 19th century.

Thagard also stated that his criteria should not be interpreted so narrowly as to allow willful ignorance of alternative explanations, or so broadly as to discount our modern science compared to science of the future. His definition is a practical one, which generally seeks to distinguish pseudoscience as areas of inquiry which are stagnant and without active scientific investigation.

== Some historians' perspectives ==
Many historians of science are concerned with the development of science from its primitive origins; consequently they define science in sufficiently broad terms to include early forms of natural knowledge. In the article on science in the eleventh edition of the Encyclopædia Britannica, the scientist and historian William Cecil Dampier Whetham defined science as "ordered knowledge of natural phenomena and of the relations between them". In his study of Greek science, Marshall Clagett defined science as "first, the orderly and systematic comprehension, description and/or explanation of natural phenomena and, secondly, the [mathematical and logical] tools necessary for the undertaking". A similar definition appeared more recently in David Pingree's study of early science: "Science is a systematic explanation of perceived or imaginary phenomena, or else is based on such an explanation. Mathematics finds a place in science only as one of the symbolical languages in which scientific explanations may be expressed." These definitions tend to emphasize the subject matter of science rather than its method and from these perspectives, the philosophical concern to establish a demarcation between science and non-science becomes "problematic, if not futile".

== Laudan ==
Larry Laudan concluded, after examining various historical attempts to establish a demarcation criterion, that "philosophy has failed to deliver the goods" in its attempts to distinguish science from non-science—to distinguish science from pseudoscience. None of the past attempts would be accepted by a majority of philosophers nor, in his opinion, should they be accepted by them or by anyone else. He stated that many well-founded beliefs are not scientific and, conversely, many scientific conjectures are not well-founded. He also stated that demarcation criteria were historically used as machines de guerre in polemical disputes between "scientists" and "pseudo-scientists". Advancing a number of examples from everyday practice of football and carpentry and non-scientific scholarship such as literary criticism and philosophy, he considered the question of whether a belief is well-founded or not to be more practically and philosophically significant than whether it is scientific or not. In his judgment, the demarcation between science and non-science was a pseudo-problem that would best be replaced by examining the distinction between reliable and unreliable knowledge, without bothering to ask whether that knowledge is scientific or not. He would consign phrases like "pseudo-science" or "unscientific" to the rhetoric of politicians or sociologists.

== Modern proposals ==
Others have disagreed with Laudan. Sebastian Lutz, for example, argued that demarcation does not have to be a single necessary and sufficient condition as Laudan implied. Rather, Laudan's reasoning at most establishes that there has to be one necessary criterion and one possibly different sufficient criterion.

Various typologies or taxonomies of sciences versus nonsciences, and reliable knowledge versus illusory knowledge, have been proposed. Ian Hacking, Massimo Pigliucci, and others have noted that the sciences generally conform to Ludwig Wittgenstein's concept of family resemblances.

Other critics have argued for multiple demarcation criteria, some suggesting that there should be one set of criteria for the natural sciences, another set of criteria for the social sciences, and claims involving the supernatural could have a set of pseudoscientific criteria. Anthropologist Sean M. Rafferty of the University at Albany, SUNY in his text Misanthropology: Science, Pseudoscience, and the Study of Humanity contrasts science and pseudoscience within his discipline thusly:

[E]ven for those subfields where there is a significant element of interpretation, those interpretations are still based on and constrained by physical evidence. And interpretations are always provisional, pending possible refutation by contradictory evidence ... Pseudoscience, by comparison, is scornful of evidence. The pseudoscientist reaches a preferred conclusion in advance, then selects evidence, often removed from any relevant context, to lend supposed support for their conclusions. Often the preconceived conclusion is one that justifies some closely held identity or ideology. Contradictory evidence is waved away or ignored, and as a last resort, one can always claim conspiracy to keep pseudoscientific ideas suppressed.

In 2025, Springer Nature published the monograph A Working Scientific Demarcation, by Damian Fernandez-Beanato, which purports to use multi-criterial meta-analyses to offer the first working general solution to the demarcation problem.

== Significance ==
Concerning science education, Michael D. Gordin wrote:

Every student in public or private schools takes several years of science, but only a small fraction of them pursue careers in the sciences. We teach the rest of them so much science so that they will appreciate what it means to be scientific – and, hopefully, become scientifically literate and apply some of those lessons in their lives. For such students, the myth of a bright line of demarcation is essential.

Discussions of the demarcation problem concern the rhetoric of science and promote critical thinking, which is important for democracy. For example, Gordin stated: "Demarcation remains essential for the enormously high political stakes of climate-change denial and other anti-regulatory fringe doctrines".

Philosopher Herbert Keuth noted:

Perhaps the most important function of the demarcation between science and nonscience is to refuse political and religious authorities the right to pass binding judgments on the truth of certain statements of fact.

Concern for informed human nutrition resulted in the following note in 1942:

If our boys and girls are to be exposed to the superficial and frequently ill-informed statements about science and medicine made over the radio and in the daily press, it is desirable, if not necessary, that some corrective in the form of accurate factual information be provided in the schools. Although this is not a plea that chemistry teachers should at once introduce the study of proteins into their curricula, it is a suggestion that they should at least inform themselves and become prepared to answer questions and counteract the effects of misinformation.

The demarcation problem has been compared to the problem of differentiating fake news from real news, which became prominent during the 2016 United States presidential election.

== See also ==
- Boundary-work
- Idealism
- Relativism
- Scientism
