= Boundary-work =

Study of boundaries between disciplines

Boundary-work is part of science studies. In boundary-work, boundaries, demarcations, or other divisions between fields of knowledge are created, advocated, attacked, or reinforced. Such delineations often have high stakes for the participants, and carry the implication that such boundaries are flexible and socially constructed.

== Thomas F. Gieryn ==
The original use of the term "boundary-work" for these sorts of issues has been attributed to Thomas F. Gieryn, a sociologist, who initially used it to discuss the problem of demarcation, the philosophical difficulty of coming up with a rigorous delineation between what is "science" and what is "non-science".

Gieryn defined boundary-work as the "attribution of selected characteristics to [an] institution of science (i.e., to its practitioners, methods, stock of knowledge, values and work organization) for purposes of constructing a social boundary that distinguishes some intellectual activities as [outside that boundary]." Gieryn suggests that Philosophers and sociologists of science, such as Karl Popper and Robert K. Merton, long struggled to come up with a criterion which would distinguish science as unique from other knowledge-generating activities, but never were able to come up with one that was stable, transhistorical, or worked reliably.

Gieryn's 1983 article on boundary-work and demarcation highlighted that the conversations surrounding the distinction between science and non-science were "ideological"; that there were strong stakes for scientists to erect such boundaries both in arguing for their own objectivity and the need for autonomy.

Gieryn looked specifically at instances of boundary-work in 19th-century Britain, in which scientists attempted to characterize the relationship between religion and science as one of sharp distinction, and also looked at instances in which scientists attempted to argue that science and politics and/or ideology were inherently separate as well. Many other works by sociologists and historians have since looked at boundary-work in many other situations, usually focusing on the rhetoric of scientists (or their opponents) and their interpersonal and intersocial interactions.

Studies in boundary-work have also focused on how individual scientific disciplines are created. Following the work of Pierre Bourdieu on the "scientific field", many have looked at ways in which certain "objects" are able to bridge the erected boundaries because they satisfy the needs of multiple social groups (boundary objects).

== Applications ==
An example of such boundary-work can be found in the study of science and literature. One instance of these studies is Aldous Huxley's book Literature and Science (see also Jennings 1970 and Garvin & Heath 1983).

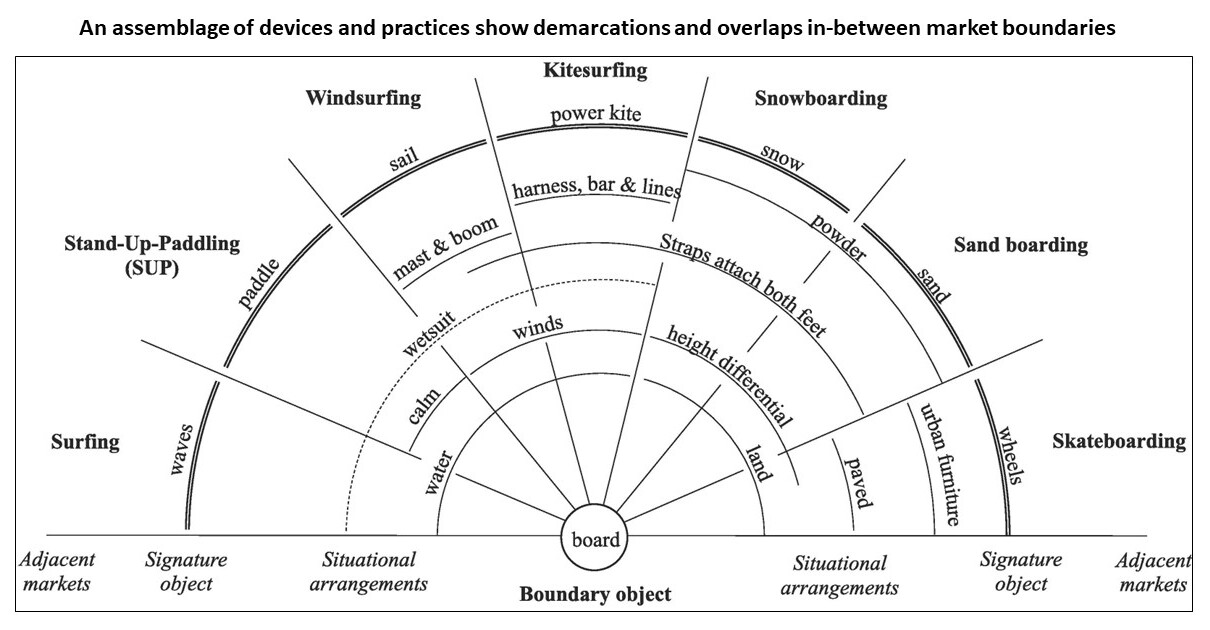
Boundary-work in market categories: An assemblage of devices and practices show demarcations and overlaps in-between boundaries of multiple board sports.

Another application of boundary-work is in the field of management and business studies, particularly in the study of the overlaps and demarcations between market categories. A market categorization problem occurs when two or more products or services are perceived to be similar enough as to become substitutes for each other in satisfying market demand. In this case, the notion of boundary work can be used to study market boundaries. Researchers have used the notion of boundary-work to study demarcations among partially-overlapping consumer practices, such as boardsport variations (e.g, surfing, windsurfing, kiteboarding and standup paddleboarding), which started as close variations of each other but that, over time, diverged into distinct markets characterized by their own norms, market actors, rules, and gear.

Another example of boundary-work occurred when individual scientists and scientific institutions published statements responding to the allegations of scientific fraud during the "Climategate" episode.

== See also ==
- Conflict thesis – Concept in history of science
- Demarcation problem – Philosophical question of how to distinguish between science and non-science
- Karl Popper – Austrian–British philosopher of science (1902–1994)
- Science wars – 1990s dispute in philosophy of science
- Trading zones (metaphor) – A shared terminology that allows collaboration between scientists from different paradigms
