= Nikki Craft =

American feminist

- Born: 1949 (age 76–77)
- Education: Eastfield Junior College
- Occupations: Writer; activist
- Website: nikkicraft.com

Nikki Craft (born 1949) is an American feminist activist and writer.

== Early life and education ==
Craft grew up in Texas and attended Eastfield Junior College in Mesquite. She cites being turned down for a groundskeeping job due to being a woman and persisting until she was eventually hired.

== Activism ==
=== 1970s ===
In 1979, Craft helped organize the first Myth California Anti-Pageant in Santa Cruz, California. In 1980 Craft joined other pageant protesters and over the next nine years conducted other actions, including throwing raw meat on the stage. The protests continued in San Diego and in 1988, after the pageant left Santa Cruz and moved to San Diego, the winner of a local pageant unveiled a banner from her bra at the state finals that read "Pageants Hurt All Women." A documentary called Miss... or Myth? examines these protests.

=== 1980s ===
In August 1984, Craft was arrested on Herring Cove Beach at Cape Cod National Seashore while protesting the park's public nudity regulations by sunbathing topless, refusing to put on a shirt when contacted by park rangers. After the U.S. Attorney's office declined to prosecute the case several months later, she returned to Cape Cod the following July and repeated the challenge, this time in the parking lot of the ranger station. She later organized a class action suit funded by the Naturist Society against the federal government, which manages the Seashore.

In 1986, Craft was arrested in Rochester, New York with six other women who were topless or "shirtfree" in public. The case was dismissed on appeal six years later, thus weakening the New York "exposure of a person" state law when pertaining to woman's breasts.

=== 1990s and onward ===
In 1995, the feminist journal On the Issues published Craft's article entitled "Busting Mister Short-Eyes" about a naturist child rapist sentenced to 30 years in prison, partly as a result of Craft's advocacy.

In 2001, she protested the War in Afghanistan and called upon other feminists to do the same. Craft has criticized leaders in leftist and progressive movements who published articles, interviews and expressed public cooperation with Larry Flynt and his magazine, Hustler as well as directly attacking Flynt for his magazine publication.
