= Dispositional affect =

Personality trait

Dispositional affect, similar to mood, is a personality trait or overall tendency to respond to situations in stable, predictable ways. This trait is expressed by the tendency to see things in a positive or negative way. People with high positive affectivity tend to perceive things through "pink lens" while people with high negative affectivity tend to perceive things through "black lens". The level of dispositional affect affects the sensations and behavior immediately and most of the time in unconscious ways, and its effect can be prolonged (between a few weeks to a few months). Research shows that there is a correlation between dispositional affect (both positive and negative) and important aspects in psychology and social science, such as personality, culture, decision making, negotiation, psychological resilience, perception of career barriers, and coping with stressful life events. That is why this topic is important both in social psychology research and organizational psychology research.

== Characteristics ==
=== Conceptual distinctions from emotion and mood ===
Besides dispositional affect, there are other concepts for expressions of emotion such as mood or discrete emotions. These concepts are different from dispositional affect though there is a connection among them.

- Dispositional affect is different from emotion or affect, by being a personality trait while emotion is a general concept for subjective responses of people to certain situations. Emotion includes both general responses (positive or negative emotion) and specific responses (love, anger, hate, fear, jealousy, sadness etc. The strength of emotions a person feels can stem from his level of dispositional affect.
- Dispositional affect is also different from moods since mood relates to general feeling that usually tends to be diffusing and not focused on a specific cause or object. Though mood is specific, it is not a personality trait. Still, positive affectivity can explain why a person has good mood in general, since positive affectivity means viewing the world in a good light. The same thing is true for negative affectivity, which can explain why a person has bad mood in general, since negative affectivity means viewing the world in a dark light.

=== Dimensions ===
In general, though emotion researchers disagree about the way that emotions and dispositional affect should be classified, a common classification of emotions assumes that each emotion is a combination of pleasantness (pleasant or unpleasant) and activation (high or low). For example, excitement is a combination of pleasantness and high activation, while calmness is a combination of pleasantness and low activation. Dispositional Affect is also a combination of pleasantness and activation. According to this classification, the different combinations of high or low pleasantness and high or low activation create four Quarters. In line with the classification mentioned above, there is a well-known and common model that is being used in organizational psychology research to analyze and classify dispositional affect, which was developed by Watson and Tellegen. The researchers claim that there are two dimensions of dispositional affect: positive affectivity and negative affectivity and that each person has a certain level of both positive affectivity and negative affectivity. Hence, according to the model and contrary to intuition, positive affectivity does not represent the opposite of negative affectivity, but a different aspect from it. According to Watson & Tellegen one must regard these quarters as two pivots which determine the positive affectivity and negative affectivity of a person. These two dimensions of dispositional affect are bipolar, distinct and independent, relating to different emotion groups, so that each person can be classified with a positive affectivity and negative affectivity grade.

- Positive affectivity – describes a person's tendency to be cheerful and energetic, and who experience positive moods, (such as pleasure or well-being), across a variety of situations, perceiving things through a "pink lens". Individuals who have low levels of positive affectivity tend to be low energy and sluggish or melancholy. High level of positive affectivity represents the extent to which an individual feels energetic and excited, while low level of positive affectivity represents the extent to which an individual feels sadness, sluggishness or weariness ".
- Negative affectivity – describes a person's tendency to be distressed and upset, and have a negative view of self over time and across situations, perceiving things through a "black lens". It is important to explain that low levels of negative affectivity are perceived as positive traits since they represent individuals who are more calm, serene and relaxed. High levels of negative affectivity represents the extent to which an individual feels anger, irritability, fear or nervousness, while low level of negative affectivity represents the extent to which an individual feels calm and serene ".

==== Relation to personality traits ====
There has been some debate over how closely related affect and some of the Big Five Model of personality traits are related. Some maintain that negative affect and positive affect are should be viewed as the same concept as Neuroticism and Extraversion from the Big Five Model, respectively. However, other researchers maintain that these concepts are related but should remain distinctly separate as they have traditionally had weak to moderate correlations, around .4. Affect and the Big Five traits can be used in a combined method to evaluate correlation between personality and financial satisfaction. When evaluating the correlation between personality and financial satisfaction when personality is defined solely on the basis of the big five model and excludes affect, there are different predictive outcomes than when evaluating the relationship between personality and financial satisfaction when personality is evaluated using a model which combines affect into the big five model.

== Measurement ==
Operationalization's for dispositional affect can be measured by questionnaires. In English researchers use the Positive Affect Negative Affect Scale (PANAS). According to the instructions of this questionnaire, the individual is asked to indicate to what extent he or she feels a certain feeling or emotion such as happy, sad, excited, enthusiastic, guilty, distressed, afraid, etc. An individual has to indicate the most appropriate answer to each item (feeling or emotion) on a scale ranging from 1-5 (1- Very slightly or not at all, 5- Extremely). Early mapping of these emotions by the researchers, helps determine the positive affectivity and negative affectivity of the individual. Another advantage that was discovered while developing this questionnaire is that though it is intended for personality analysis, people can respond to the questions according to specific time frames, for example people can indicate the emotions or sensations they feel at this moment, in the past week, or in general. This way we can learn about dispositional affect to a certain situation and not only about dispositional affect as a general personality trait. By responding to the questions about feelings "in general" we can learn about positive and negative affectivity as a personality trait. By responding to the questions about feelings "at this moment" we can learn about situational dispositional affect as a response to a certain situation. For example, Rafaeli et al., showed in their research that waiting in line cause an increase in negative affectivity levels.

== Physical and mental aspects ==
- Physical health – When it comes to people with different illness, it is interesting to see that there are differences in the physical health according to the levels of dispositional affect. Individuals who have high levels of positive affectivity, had longer life span, reported fewer pains and illness symptoms (such as blood pressure), and were less likely to develop a cold when exposed to a virus compared with individuals who have high levels of negative affectivity, while both had the same illness. It was also discovered that when it comes to people with chronic diseases that has decent prospects for long-term survival, (such as coronary heart disease), people may benefit from high levels of positive affectivity. However, when it comes to people with chronic diseases that has short-term prognoses (e.g., metastatic breast cancer) and poor survival chances, high levels of positive affectivity may be detrimental to the health of these individuals, possibly as a consequence of underreporting of symptoms resulting in inadequate care, or of a lack of adherence to treatment.
- Lifestyle – Even when it comes to healthy individuals, it seems that there are differences between people's life style, due to their dispositional affect trait. Individuals who have high levels of positive affectivity tend to attend healthier activities such as improved sleep quality, more physical exercise, and more intake of dietary vitamins, and tend to socialize more often and maintain more and higher-quality social ties. It was also found that high levels of positive affectivity may result in more and closer social contacts because it facilitates approach behavior, and because others are drawn to form attachments with pleasant individuals.
- Psychological resilience – Individuals who have high levels of positive affectivity have lower levels of the stress hormones (such as epinephrine, norepinephrine, and cortisol), thus physiology gives one explanation in favor of psychological resilience that provides positive resources to confront stressful life events. On the other hand, the broaden-and-build theory provides a different explanation from the physiological one, and claim that individuals who have high levels of positive affectivity and experience positive events in the present, create a spiral or "snow ball" effect, that may lead to higher probability to experience positive events in the future as well. This means that happiness and well-being sensations in the present, are the ones which creates the likelihood to feel the same in the future, which helps us in building a strong and improved system of coping with stressful life events.
- Dispositional Affect and the Workplace - Dispositional affect in the work place can be influential on how a person performs, or even how one is treated based on this affect. This can be broke up into two small categories. Those with a more positive dispositional affect, meaning high in PA, or those with a more negative dispositional affect, meaning high NA.
  - Dispositional affect influences work attitudes, as well as work results. This is because the brain has different processes induced by dispositional affect. Work attitudes will also be based on how a person interprets their work, which is based on that person's dispositional affect. For example, if a person leans towards having a more 'positive' dispositional affect, which would mean low in negative affect, and high in positive affect, than they may have a more positive outlook towards their job, and components of their job; for example projects, bosses, coworkers, etc. Building off of this, studies have shown that people who have a dispositional affect with higher positive affectivity, receive an overall more positive response from the environment than people with high NA, or even people with low PA. Its also been found that people with low PA tend to be less enthusiastic, and have lower energy than those with high PA. This relates to how people with high PA in dispositional affect have a higher drive to succeed in their goals.
  - Negative disposition has been found to affect working memory. Also, negative disposition has been correlated with workplace bullying in one study that suggests that individuals with more negative disposition are more likely to receive harassment in the workplace. Counterproductive workplace behavior is strongly correlated with negative disposition, and can also lead to moral disengagement.
- Positive and Negative Affect
  - Positive - Positive Affect is an internal feeling that occurs when a goal has been completed, a threat has been avoided or the individual is pleased with there present state. People with higher positive affect usually have healthier coping styles, more positive self-qualities, and are more goal oriented. Research has linked positive affectivity with longevity, better sleep, and a decrease in stress hormones.
  - Negative - Negative Affect is an internal feeling that occurs when an individual fails to complete a goal, wasn't able to avoid a threat or is not pleased with their present state. Negative Affect encompasses such emotions as anger, guilt, fear, etc. Research has shown that negativity relates to poor coping skills, health complaints, frequency of unpleasant events etc.
- Coping - Some studies have found a relationship between Dispositional affect and the coping mechanisms used in attaining ones goals. Those with a positive dispositional affect were more successful in using task-oriented coping methods (which involve directly addressing the issue at hand), while those with a negative dispositional affect were more successful in using avoidant coping strategies (which involve managing stressful situations in an indirect way).

== Culture ==
Though it is agreed that there are differences between one culture and another, most of the differences that were addressed in researches are related to the comparison between individualism and collectivism. In individualistic cultures, it was found that there is a strong relationship between dispositional affect (either positive or negative) and general life satisfaction (though the relationship was stronger for positive affectivity compared to negative affectivity). On the other hand, in many collectivistic cultures, it was found that there is a no relationship between negative affectivity and general life satisfaction, and it may result from the great variance in the ways that different cultures regulate their positive affectivity compared to negative affectivity.

== Decision making and negotiation ==
- Decision making – In dealing with interesting and important situations, it was found that individuals who have high levels of positive affectivity make a thorough and efficient cognitive processing, and therefore their decision making process is more efficient, flexible, creative and innovative. It was also found that positive affectivity facilitates creativity, cognitive flexibility, novel responses, openness to new information and dealing with mental problems. This stems from the fact that positive affectivity encourages problem solving approach and searching for variety, in order to achieve a suitable result. At last, it was found that high levels of positive affectivity does not encourage risk taking, though it does facilitates negotiation processes, and improves the results of face to face negotiation processes, in order to reach to agreement.
- Negotiation – When individuals negotiate, it was found that high levels of positive affectivity was related to optimistic view of the upcoming results, planning and using cooperation strategies, and better results regarding the agreements that were made, both in personal (and not formal) negotiation, and group (formal) negotiation. It was also found that positive affectivity increases the likelihood to use cooperation strategies (but not other strategies such as "an eye for an eye") and improves the results of the negotiation, even if just one of the negotiators has the desired trait of positive affectivity, and increases the likelihood and willingness to agree with counter–arguments, and behavior changes as a result. Another support for the findings presented above, showed that high levels of positive affectivity was related to willingness to compromise and give up, finding creative solutions, using cooperative strategies, less cheating and better results in negotiation processes. On the contrary to the findings about positive affectivity, it was found that high levels of negative affectivity was related to usage of competitive strategies, and much worse results regarding the agreements that were made. Another support for these finding showed that high levels of negative affectivity was related to competition, lower offers, rejecting ultimatums and lower combined gains, as a result of the negotiation process, and minimum willingness to continue the cooperation strategy in the future.

== See also ==
- Alice M. Isen
- Barbara Fredrickson
- Broaden-and-build
- Decision making
- Emotions and culture
