= Marcial Losada =

Chilean psychologist (1939–2020)

- Born: 1939
- Died: 2020
- Education: University of Michigan
- Occupation: Psychologist
- Known for: Former director of the Center for Advanced Research

Marcial Losada (1939–2020) was a Chilean psychologist, consultant, and former director of the Center for Advanced Research (CFAR) in Ann Arbor, Michigan. He is known for his work in academia and business focusing on the development of "high performance teams", and having participated in partially retracted collaborative work with Barbara Fredrickson of the University of North Carolina, a retraction for which he has been assigned the culpability.

== Early life and education ==
Marcial Francisco Losada was born in 1939 in Chile. He received a Ph.D. in organizational psychology from the University of Michigan.

== Career ==
After finishing his doctoral work, Losada served as a Center for Advanced Research (CFAR) in Ann Arbor, Michigan. In his career, Losada developed a nonlinear dynamics model, the meta learning model, to show dynamical patterns achieved by high, medium and low performing teams, where performance was evaluated based on profitability, customer satisfaction, and 360-degree feedback. In pursuing these goals, he founded and served as executive director of Losada Line Consulting, which had presented past workshops and seminars at companies including Apple, Boeing, EDS, GM, and Merck, and foundations including the Kellogg and Mellon Foundations, with high performance team-building contracts at BCI, Banchile, BHP-Billiton, Codelco, and Telefónica.

Losada claimed the dynamical patterns related to team performance appear in coordinate spaces of "positivity-negativity," "inquiry-advocacy" and "other-self," and are controlled by connectivity, which is supposed to reflect interpersonal attunement of a team. Losada, along with Barbara Fredrickson, developed the concept of the critical positivity ratio (also known as the Losada line), which states that there exist precise cut-off points for an individual's ratio of positive to negative emotions, above and below which the individual will fail to flourish.

Beginning in 2008, measured criticism began for the 2005 and earlier papers, including from Luoma, Hämäläinen, and Saarinen of the Systems Analysis Laboratory at Aalto University, and Navas at CNRS, reports that did not draw widespread attention. The criticism of the work for flawed methodology and invalid application of differential equations was renewed and much amplified by the report by psychologists Nicholas J.L. Brown and Harris Friedman and mathematician Alan Sokal.

Losada's coauthor, Fredrickson, continues to insist on the measurability of such a ratio, and the existence tipping-points, but has distanced herself from the mathematical portions of the 2005 paper, which were subsequently retracted by the journal; Fredrickson reports that Losada declined to respond to the criticism.

== Personal life ==
Losada died in 2020.

== Bibliography ==
- Losada, M. (1999). The Complex Dynamics of High Performance Teams. Mathematical and Computer Modelling, 30 (9-10), 179–192.
- Losada, M., & Heaphy, E. (2004). The Role of Positivity and Connectivity in the Performance of Business Teams: A Nonlinear Dynamics Model. American Behavioral Scientist, 47 (6), 740–765.
- Fredrickson, B. L. & Losada, M. (2005). Positive Affect and the Complex Dynamics of Human Flourishing. American Psychologist, 60 (7) 678–686.
- Fredrickson, B. L. (2009). Positivity: Top-Notch Research Reveals the 3-to-1 Positivity Ratio that Will Change Your life. Crown Publishers, New York.
