= Class-XD Amplifier =

Proprietary amplifier technology

Class XD (crossover displacement) is a proprietary and patented amplifier technology developed in-house by Cambridge Audio.

First appearing in 2006 in the Azur 840A integrated amplifier, the Crossover Displacement design sought to combine the performance of a traditional Class A design with the efficiency of Class B but without the linearity and distortion limitations of Class AB. In Class A amplification the output transistors are modulated by the audio signal to turn more or less ‘on’ but never actually turn off. However, in Class B the output transistors actually turn off at some point as the output is passed from one transistor to another. In the point at which the output moves from one transistor to another (the crossover point), a small amount of distortion is created. "This crossover distortion is inevitable and although it can be minimized, Cambridge's Class XD alternative doesn't eliminate crossover distortion, it shifts it away from the zero-crossing point of the waveform."

== Amplifier technology ==
=== Class A ===
Class A amplifiers avoid crossover distortion (because the transistors are always on) but at the expense of generating a lot of heat. Managing this heat and power dissipation means that Class A designs can be expensive to implement and of lower power output to minimize heat build-up.

=== Class B ===
Class B amplifiers inherently generate crossover distortion and display this non-linearity at the zero-crossing, where the crossover distortion is in evidence no matter how low the signal amplitude. At one unique value of quiescent current, the distortion produced is minimized, and this is what characterizes optimal Class B.

=== Class XD ===
It would be much more desirable for some to have an amplifier that would give Class A performance up to the transition level, with Class B after that, rather than AB. This would abolish the AB gain changes that cause extra distortion.

This is the basic Class XD principle, to develop a topology that displaces the crossover point to one side of zero crossing – it can be either positive or negative. This is achieved by the injection of an extra current into the output point of a conventional Class B amplifier.

The added ‘displacement’ current does not directly alter the voltage at the output - the output stage inherently has low output impedance, and this is further lowered by the use of global negative feedback. What it does do is alter the pattern of current flowing in the output devices. The displacement current can be sunk to V− from the output, or sourced from V+, so the crossover region is either displaced downward or is pulled upwards. This is arbitrary as the direction of displacement makes no difference; either could be used.

== Advantages ==
- Class XD pushes crossover distortion away from the central point where the amplifier output spends most of its time.
- Below the transition point the amplifier actually runs in pure Class A with no crossover artifacts at all.
- Above the transition point the amplifier moves into an optimized Class B with still lower distortion than is possible with Class AB.
- Much lower heat than Class A, although more than conventional Class AB designs.
