= Alan Sokal =

American physicist and mathematician (born 1955)

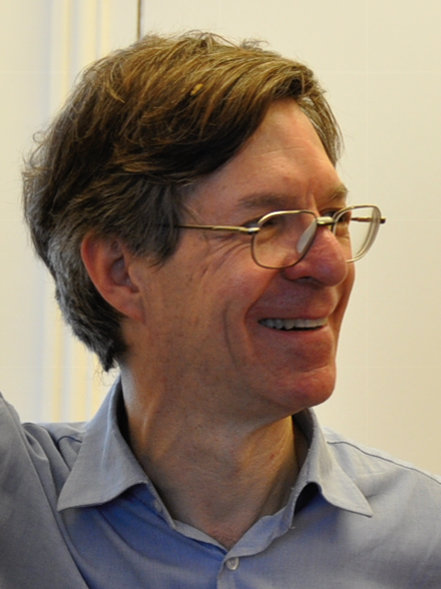
- Sokal in 2011
- Born: January 24, 1955 (age 71); Boston, Massachusetts, U.S.
- Education: Harvard University (BA); Princeton University (PhD)
- Known for: Sokal affair
- Father: Nathan O. Sokal
- Scientific career
- Fields: Physics, mathematics, philosophy of science
- Workplaces: New York University; National Autonomous University of Nicaragua; University College London
- Thesis: An Alternate Constructive Approach to the φ^{4}_{3} Quantum Field Theory, and a Possible Destructive Approach to φ^{4}_{4} (1981)
- Doctoral advisor: Arthur Wightman

Alan David Sokal (/ˈsoʊkəl/ SOH-kəl; born January 24, 1955) is an American professor of mathematics at University College London and professor emeritus of physics at New York University. He works with statistical mechanics and combinatorics.

Sokal is a critic of postmodernism, and caused the Sokal affair in 1996 when his deliberately nonsensical paper was published by Duke University Press's Social Text. He also co-authored a paper criticizing the critical positivity ratio concept in positive psychology.

== Early life and academic career ==
Sokal was born to Nathan O. Sokal (1929–2016), an electrical engineer of Polish descent, and Zelda Kaufman Sokal. He received his Bachelor of Arts degree from Harvard College in 1976 and his PhD from Princeton University in 1981. He was advised by the physicist Arthur Wightman. During the summers of 1986, 1987, and 1988, Sokal taught mathematics at the National Autonomous University of Nicaragua, when the Sandinistas controlled the elected government.

== Research interests ==
Sokal's research involves mathematical physics and combinatorics. In particular, he studies the interplay between these topics based on questions concerning statistical mechanics and quantum field theory. This includes work on the chromatic polynomial and the Tutte polynomial, which appear both in algebraic graph theory and in the study of phase transitions in statistical mechanics. His interests include computational physics and algorithms, such as Markov chain Monte Carlo algorithms for problems in statistical physics. He also co-authored a book on quantum triviality.

In 2013, Sokal co-authored a paper with Nicholas Brown and Harris Friedman, rejecting the Losada Line, a concept popular in positive psychology. Named after its proposer, Marcial Losada, it refers to a critical range for an individual's ratio of positive to negative emotions, outside of which the individual will tend to have poorer life and occupational outcomes. This concept of a critical positivity ratio was much cited and popularised by psychologists such as Barbara Fredrickson. The trio's paper, published in American Psychologist, contended that the ratio was based on faulty mathematical reasoning and therefore invalid.

During his high school years and undergraduate studies at Harvard in the 1970s, Sokal collaborated with his father, Nathan, on his work on RF power amplifiers: their work was motivated by their mutual interest in amateur radio. This has resulted in the introduction of class-E high-efficiency power amplifier, and Sokals were awarded the U.S. Patents 3,900,823 and 3,919,656. In 2007, Alan and Nathan Sokal were awarded Microwave Pioneer Award by IEEE Microwave Theory and Technology Society for "development of the class E power amplifier."

== Critiques of postmodernism ==
=== Sokal affair ===
In 1996, Sokal was curious whether the then-non-peer-reviewed postmodern cultural studies journal Social Text (published by Duke University Press) would publish a submission which "flattered the editors' ideological preconceptions". Sokal submitted a grand-sounding but completely nonsensical paper titled "Transgressing the Boundaries: Toward a Transformative Hermeneutics of Quantum Gravity".

After holding the article back from earlier issues because of Sokal's refusal to consider revisions, the staff published it in the "Science Wars" issue as a relevant contribution. Soon thereafter, Sokal then revealed that the article was a hoax in the journal Lingua Franca, arguing that leftists and social science would be better served by intellectual underpinnings based on reason. The affair was front-page news in The New York Times on May 18, 1996. Sokal responded to leftist and postmodernist criticism of the deception by asserting that he was himself a leftist, and that his motivation was to "defend the Left from a trendy segment of itself".

Sokal followed up in 1997 by co-authoring the book Impostures Intellectuelles with physicist and philosopher of science Jean Bricmont (published in English, a year later, as Fashionable Nonsense). The book accuses some social sciences academics of using scientific and mathematical terms incorrectly and criticizes proponents of the "strong program" of the sociology of science for denying the value of truth. The book had contrasted reviews, with some lauding the effort, and some more reserved.

In 2008, Sokal reviewed the Sokal affair and its implications in the book Beyond the Hoax.

=== Other critiques ===
In 2024, Sokal co-authored an opinion-editorial article in the newspaper The Boston Globe with evolutionary biologist Richard Dawkins criticizing the use of the terminology "sex assigned at birth" instead of "sex" by the American Medical Association, the American Psychological Association, the American Academy of Pediatrics, and the Centers for Disease Control and Prevention. Sokal and Dawkins argued that sex is an "objective biological reality" that "is determined at conception and is then observed at birth", rather than assigned by a medical professional. Terming this "social constructionism gone amok", Sokal and Dawkins argued further that "distort[ing] the scientific facts in the service of a social cause" risks undermining trust in medical institutions. Sokal repeated these criticisms in an editorial for the magazine The Critic discussing the more general politicization of science, especially biology and medicine.
