= SY4307A =

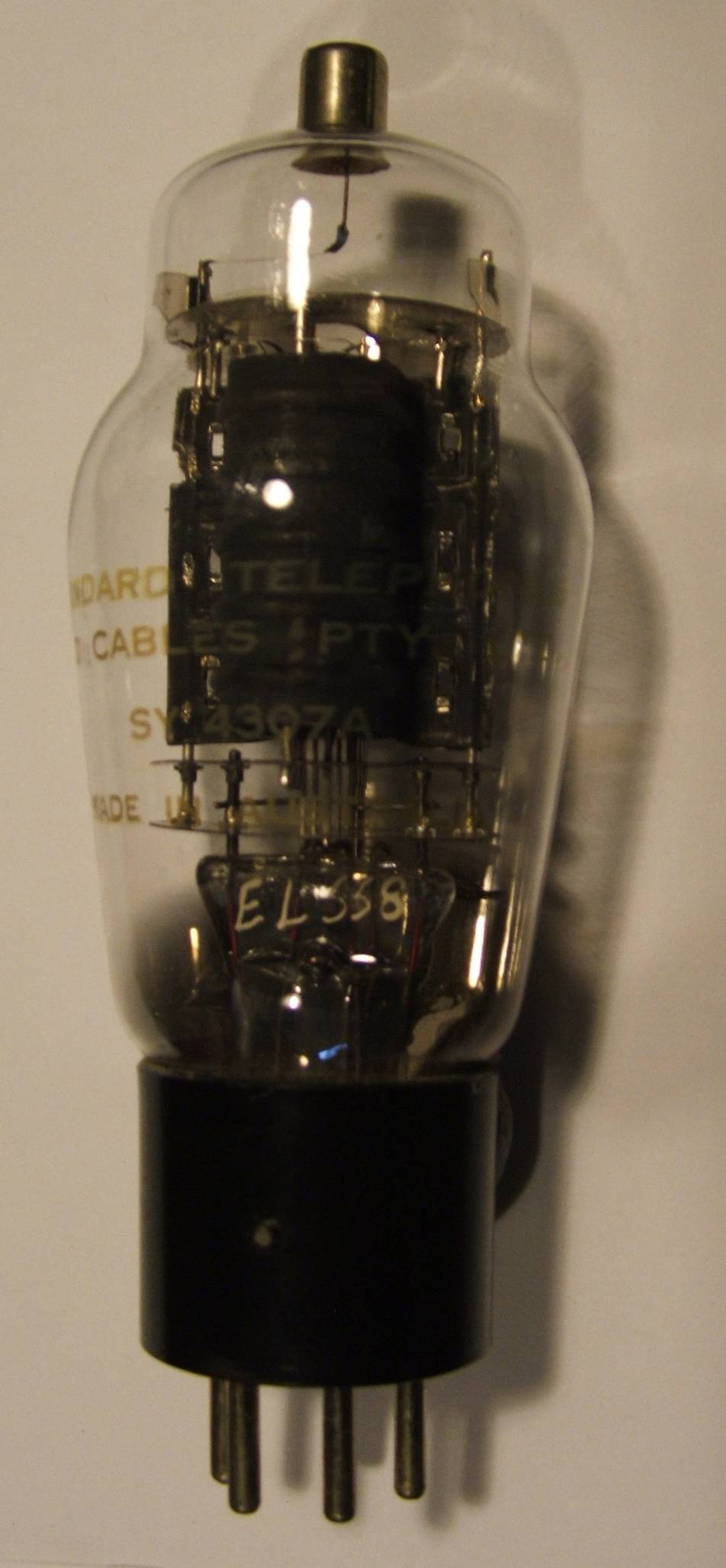
- Standard Telephones and Cables/Brimar brand Australian Pentode, type SY4307A, c1940
- Classification: Power Output Pentode
- Service: Class C amplifier, (Radio Frequency)

Cathode
- Cathode type: Directly heated
- Filament voltage: 5v
- Filament current: 1A

Anode
- Max dissipation Watts: 6W
- Max voltage: 500v

Socket connections
- American 5 Pin, (UX5) with side locating pin between pis 1 and 2. Pin 1, Heater/Cathode; Pin 2, Screen Grid, g2 Pin-3, Control Grid, g1 Pin-4, Suppressor Grid; Pin-5, Heater/Cathode Top Cap, Anode/Plate

References
- 4307A datasheet

The type SY4307A is the STC version of the Western Electric 307A, a power output pentode possessing a similar power rating, but significantly different characteristics to the far more common type 807 thermionic valve/vacuum tube. The "SY" prefix denotes the site of manufacture as being Sydney. The plant, operated by Standard Telephones and Cables Pty. Ltd. was located on Mandible Street in the suburb of Alexandria and existed under that corporate entity from 1937 to 1970. Although the remaining structure postdates the depicted device, this device was likely assembled on an adjoining property upon which the structures have been demolished and site re-purposed.

Electrically equivalent devices marked "307A" were manufactured in North America by Western Electric and these possibly predate the Australian version.

== Uses ==
Although the 807 is used for both audio amplification, (usually class AB), and radio frequency amplification in the 1-30 MHz range, (usually class C), this type was usually used for the latter.
This tube/valve is a pentode with a 'directly heated cathode', meaning that the cathode consists of an emissive oxide coated filament. These features suggest the 4307A could predate and is contemporary with, the 807 which is a beam power tetrode, a more advanced design with a more linear transfer characteristic and a more complex 'indirectly heated cathode'.

== Similarity to 807 ==
If the pinout of the 4307A is compared to that of the 807 the similarity is striking. All pins are assigned equivalent electrodes with the exception of pin 4, which is the suppressor grid, g3, in this type but in the 807 pin 4 is connected to the equivalent of a suppressor grid, the 'beam plates' and also the separate indirectly heated cathode. It is possible to interchange the two with the relatively minor alteration involving the linking of pins 4 and 5 and ensuring the heater supply is floating (not connected to other heaters). If the heater is supplied from an A.C. source, linking pin 4 to the centre of that source and the cathode bootstrap minimizes hum pickup.

== Historical significance ==
The STC/Brimar-made SY4307A was used extensively during World War II by the Australian armed forces and the example depicted is marked on the Bakelite collar of its base with the "D broad arrow D" commonwealth department of defense mark.

Two SY4307As were used, wired in parallel, as the output stage, or "final", in a transmitter constructed clandestinely by the Australian soldiers of Sparrow Force in Japanese occupied Portuguese Timor in 1942. This transmitter became known affectionately as "Winnie the War Winner ", named after the British wartime Prime Minister, Winston Churchill.

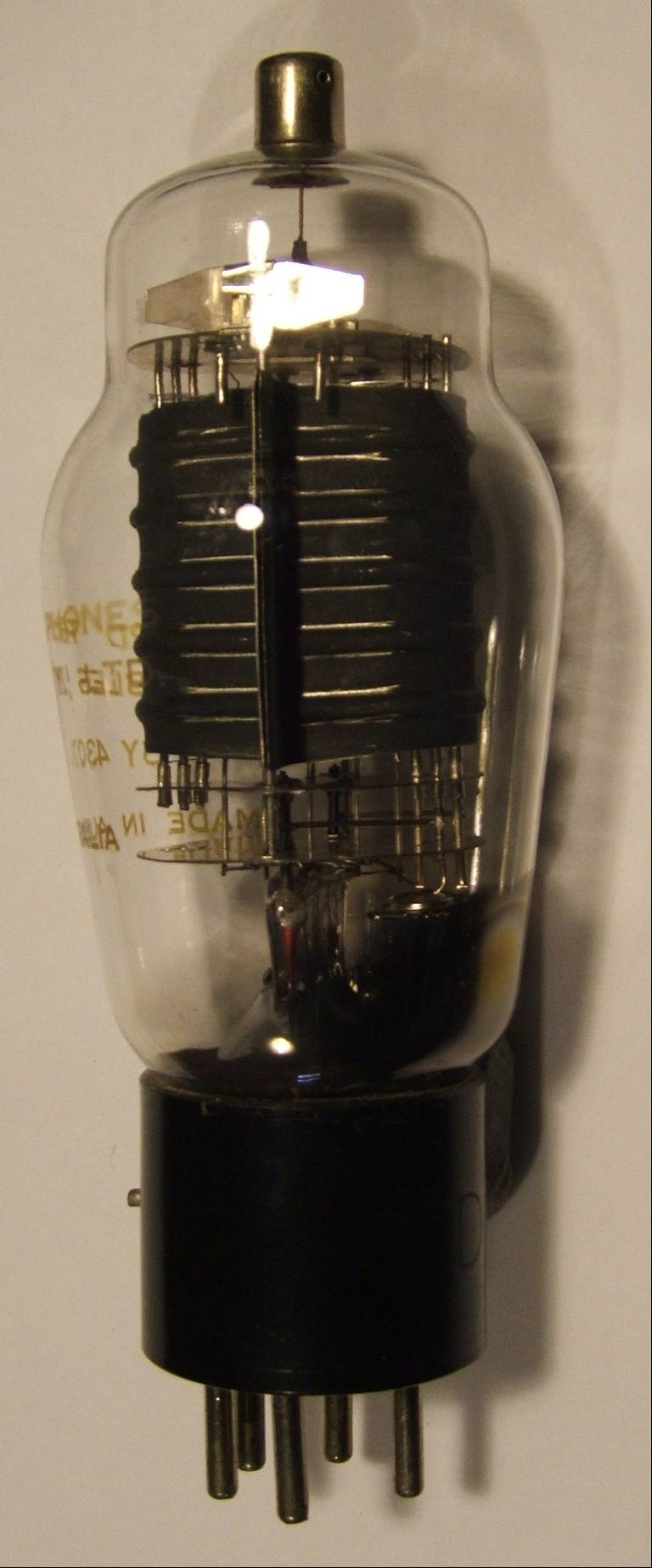
Side view of SY4307A

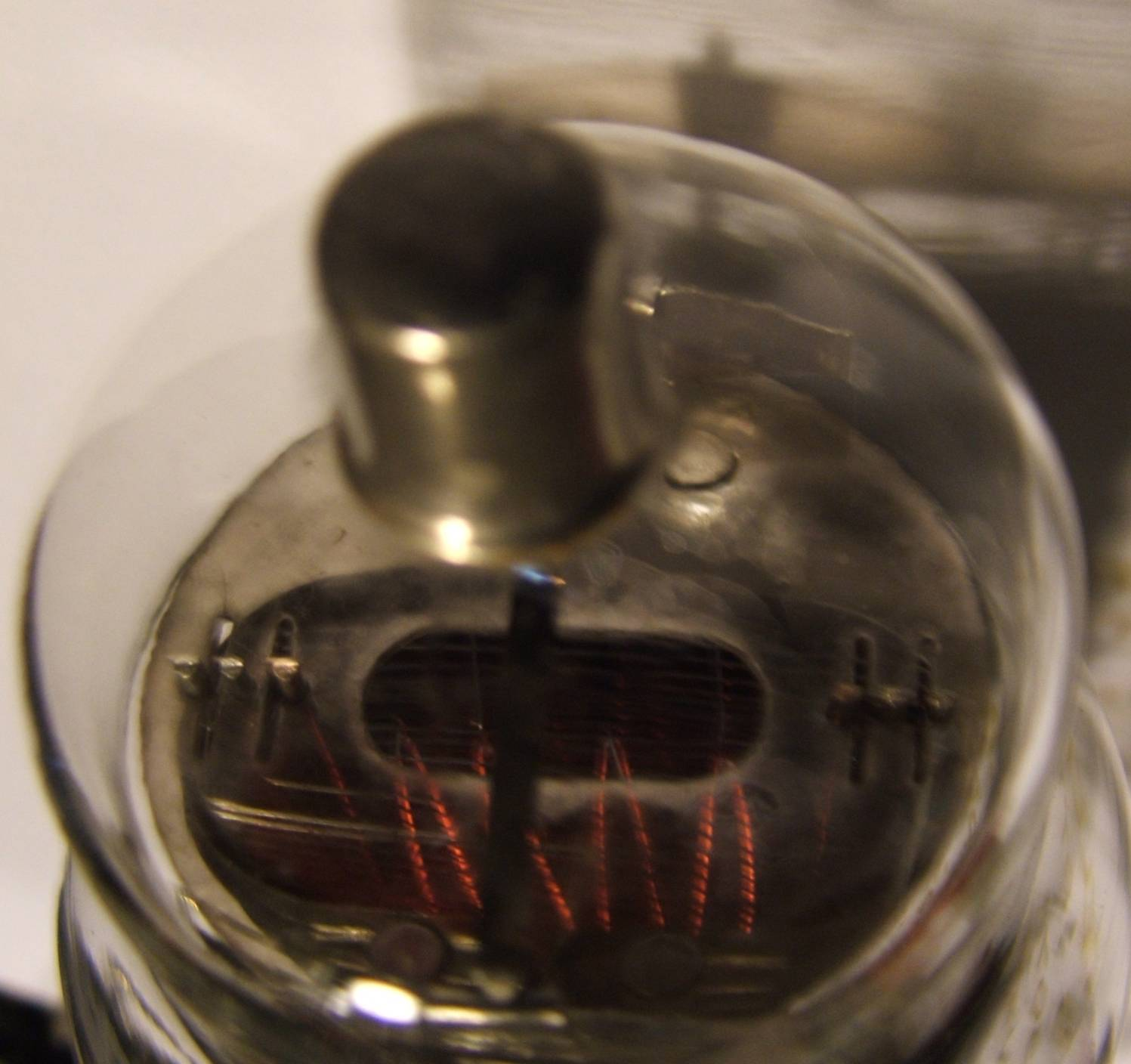
View of directly heated cathode of the SY4307A

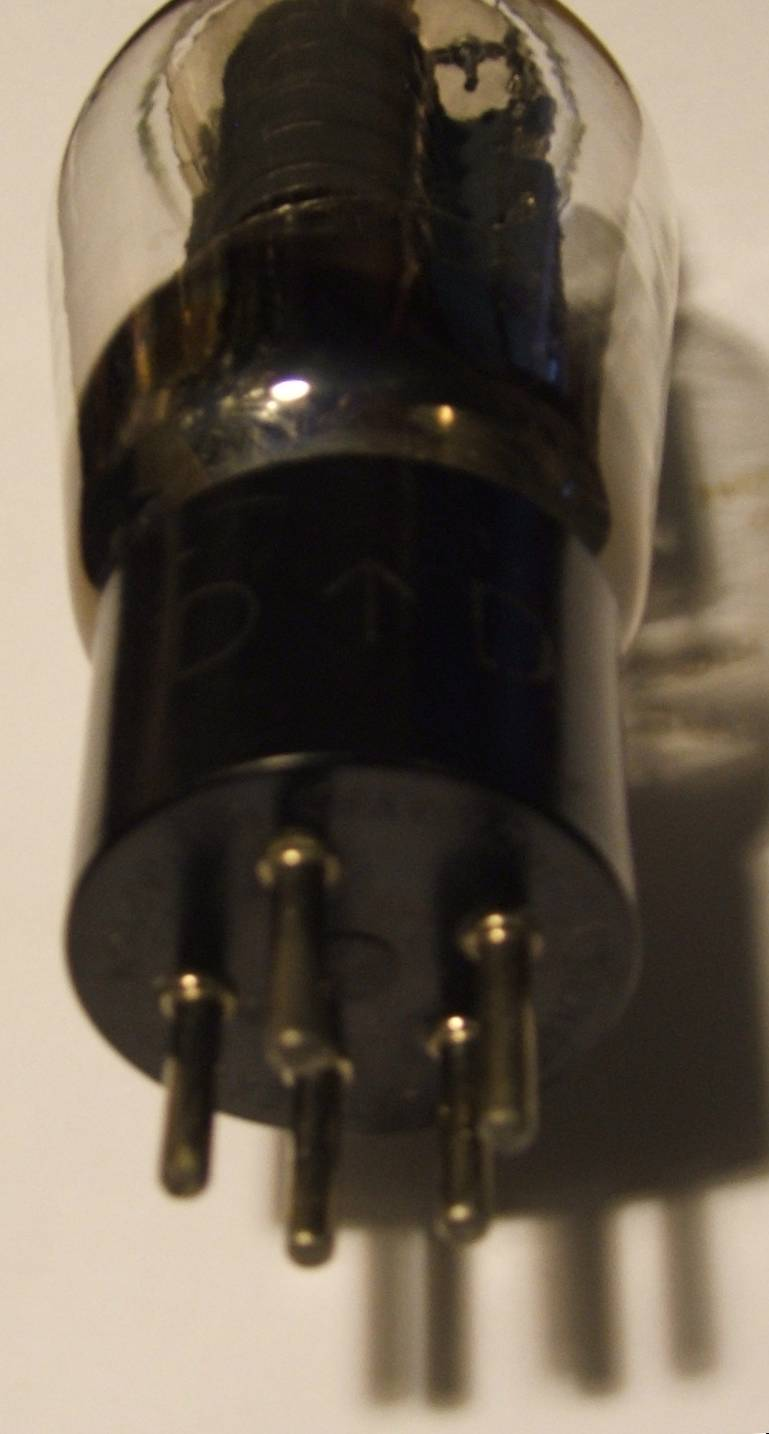
View of UX5 Base of the SY4307A

== See also ==
- List of vacuum tubes
