= Meta-learning =

Aspect of metacognition

Meta-learning is a branch of metacognition concerned with learning about one's own learning and learning processes.

The term comes from the meta prefix's modern meaning of an abstract recursion, or "X about X", similar to its use in metaknowledge, metamemory, and meta-emotion.

== Meta learning model for teams and relationships ==
Marcial Losada and other researchers have attempted to create a meta learning model to analyze teams and relationships. A 2013 paper provided a strong critique of this attempt, arguing that it was based on misapplication of complex mathematical modelling. This led to its abandonment by at least one former proponent.

The meta learning model proposed by Losada is identical to the Lorenz system, which was originally proposed as a simplified mathematical model for atmospheric convection. It comprises one control parameter and three state variables, which in this case have been mapped to "connectivity", "inquiry-advocacy", "positivity-negativity", and "other-self" (external-internal focus) respectively. The state variables are linked by a set of nonlinear differential equations. This has been criticized as a poorly defined, poorly justified, and invalid application of differential equations.

Losada and colleagues claim to have arrived at the meta learning model from thousands of time series data generated at two human interaction laboratories in Ann Arbor, Michigan, and Cambridge, Massachusetts, although the details of the collection of this data, and the connection between the time series data and the model is unclear. These time series portrayed the interaction dynamics of business teams doing typical business tasks such as strategic planning. These teams were classified into three performance categories: high, medium and low. Performance was evaluated by the profitability of the teams, the level of satisfaction of their clients, and 360-degree evaluations.

One proposed result of this theory is that there is a ratio of positivity-to-negativity of at least 2.9 (called the Losada line), which separates high from low performance teams as well as flourishing from languishing in individuals and relationships. Brown and colleagues pointed out that even if the proposed meta-learning model were valid, this ratio results from a completely arbitrary choice of model parameters carried over from the literature on modeling atmospheric convection by Lorenz and others, without any justification.

== Ideas for implementation and goals ==
Meta learning can also be a very effective tool to assist students in becoming independently self-reflective. Students will require feedback in order to reflect on their learning, strengths, and weaknesses. Meta learning tasks will help students be more proactive and effective learners by focusing on developing self-awareness. Meta learning tasks would provide students with the opportunity to better understand their thinking processes in order to devise custom learning strategies. The goal is to find a set of parameters that work well across different tasks so that learners start with a bias that allows them to perform well despite receiving only a small amount of task-specific data.

== See also ==
- Learning styles
- Mentalization
- Metacognition
- Metaknowledge
- Metamemory
- Meta-emotion
- Self-regulated learning
