= Positive and Negative Affect Schedule =

Self-report questionnaire

- Purpose: assessment of positive and negative affect

The Positive and Negative Affect Schedule (PANAS) is a self-report questionnaire that consists of two 10-item scales to measure both positive and negative affect. Each item is rated on a 5-point verbal frequency scale of 1 (not at all) to 5 (very much). The measure has been used mainly as a research tool in group studies, but can be utilized within clinical and non-clinical populations as well. Shortened, elongated, and children's versions of the PANAS have been developed, taking approximately 5–10 minutes to complete. Clinical and non-clinical studies have found the PANAS to be a reliable and valid instrument in the assessment of positive and negative affect.

== History ==
The PANAS was developed in 1988 by researchers from the University of Minnesota and Southern Methodist University. Previous mood measures have shown correlations of variable strength between positive and negative affect, and these same measures have questionable reliability and validity. Watson, Clark, and Tellegen developed the PANAS in an attempt to provide a better, purer measure of each of these dimensions.

The researchers extracted 60 terms from the factor analyses of Michael Zevon and Tellegen shown to be relatively accurate markers of either positive or negative affect, but not both. They chose terms that met a strong correlation to one corresponding dimension but exhibited a weak correlation to the other. Through multiple rounds of elimination and preliminary analyses with a test population, the researchers arrived at 10 terms for each of the two scales, as follows:

| Positive affect | Negative affect |
|---|---|
| Attentive | Hostile |
| Active | Irritable |
| Alert | Ashamed |
| Excited | Guilty |
| Enthusiastic | Distressed |
| Determined | Upset |
| Inspired | Scared |
| Proud | Afraid |
| Interested | Jittery |
| Strong | Nervous |

== Versions ==
=== PANAS-C ===
The PANAS for Children (PANAS-C) was developed in an attempt to differentiate the affective expressions of anxiety and depression in children. The tripartite model on which this measure is based suggests that high levels of negative affect is present in those with anxiety and depression, but high levels of positive affect is not shared between the two. Previous mood scales for children have been shown to reliably capture the former relationship but not the latter; the PANAS-C was created as a tool with better discriminant validity for child assessment. Similar to the development of the original PANAS, the PANAS-C drew from terms of the PANAS-X and eliminated several terms with insufficient correlations between the term and the affective construct after preliminary analyses with a non-clinical sample of children. The final version of the measure consists of 27 items: 12 positive affect terms and 15 negative affect terms. Despite the purpose of its development, however, the measure's discriminant validity is still wanting.

=== PANAS-SF ===
The PANAS-SF, comprises 10 items that were determined through the highest factor loadings on the exploratory factor analysis reported by Watson et al. (1988) in his original PANAS. Previous mood scales, such that of Bradburn, had low reliabilities and high correlations between subscales. Watson was able to address these concerns in his study of the original PANAS; however, his participants consisted mostly of student populations. The purpose of the PANAS-SF was not only to provide a shorter and more concise form of the PANAS, but to be able to apply the schedules to older clinical populations. Overall, it was reported that this modified model was consistent with Watson's.

=== I-PANAS-SF ===
Separate from the PANAS-SF, Edmund Thompson created the international PANAS short form (I-PANAS-SF) in order to make a 10 item mood scale that can be implemented effectively on an international level, provide more clarity on the content of the items, reduce ambiguities, address the limitations of the original and the previous short form of the PANAS, and also to provide a shorter, yet dependable and valid scale.

10 items = 5 terms x 2 scales:

| Positive affect | Negative affect |
|---|---|
| Active | Hostile |
| Attentive | Ashamed |
| Alert | Upset |
| Determined | Afraid |
| Inspired | Nervous |

To determine the 10 items of the 20 original items, two focus groups were utilized to evaluate all of the original 20 PANAS items. They found that while some items were easily understood by the participant, certains items had different meanings or were too ambiguous. Items that had too much ambiguity were eliminated from the modified form. Researchers found that the I-PANAS-SF had high correlations with the original PANAS. Through multiple tests and studies, they were able to determine that the I-PANAS-SF was on par with the original scale and can be used as a reliable, valid, brief, and efficient instrument on an international scale.

=== PANAS-X ===
In 1994, Watson and Clark developed an expanded form of the PANAS, called the PANAS-X, that consists of 60 items that can be completed in 10 minutes or less. The PANAS-X incorporates the original, higher order dimensions specified in the PANAS in addition to the measures of 11 lower order emotional states. These measures are broken down into three main categories: basic negative emotion scales consisting of fear, hostility, guilt, and sadness; basic positive emotion scales consisting of joviality, self-assurance, and attentiveness; and other affective states consisting of shyness, fatigue, serenity, and surprise. Through extensive analyses, all eleven affective states, with the exception of surprise, were shown to be stable, valid measures that assess how an individual's emotional states fluctuate over time.

== Impact ==
Many forms of the PANAS (PANAS-C, PANAS-X, I-PANAS-SF, among others) have shown that the PANAS has been widely employed. Recent studies have also shown that the PANAS can be administered in a large general adult population, as well as other populations. However, to date, the PANAS is mostly used as a research tool in group studies, but it has the potential to be utilized in clinical work with individuals. Furthermore, the PANAS has the potential to be used to evaluate mental illnesses, as shown in an experiment conducted by Dyck, Jolly, and Kramer, which demonstrated its effectiveness in distinguishing between depression and anxiety in clinical samples.

== Limitations ==
Since the PANAS is a self-report questionnaire, it can be difficult to assess people's mood accurately, as people can overstate or understate their experience of their moods. In addition, the original PANAS had a limited sample size of college students, which concerns with wide applicability to other samples. Furthermore, some studies claim that the PANAS is too long or that its items are redundant. The PANAS does not encompass higher order mood states.
