= Critical positivity ratio =

Discredited statistical finding in positive psychology

The critical positivity ratio is a proposed threshold in positive psychology for the ratio of positive to negative affect associated with human flourishing. In a 2005 paper in American Psychologist, psychologists Barbara Fredrickson and Marcial Losada argued that a model based on nonlinear dynamics identified a lower critical ratio of 2.9013 and an upper limit of 11.6346, with ratios within that range associated with "flourishing" rather than "languishing". The idea attracted substantial academic and popular attention, and Fredrickson later promoted a simplified 3-to-1 ratio in her 2009 book Positivity.

The mathematical basis of the proposed ratio was questioned by researchers beginning in 2008 and was challenged more extensively in 2013 by Nick Brown, Alan Sokal and Harris Friedman. They argued that the model misapplied equations derived from the Lorenz system and that the specific numerical thresholds were unsupported. Fredrickson subsequently accepted that the modelling did not establish precise critical values, while maintaining that higher positivity-to-negativity ratios could still be beneficial. American Psychologist formally retracted the mathematical modelling underlying the specific critical ratios. Later scholarly responses continued to debate aspects of the modelling and the empirical basis for a critical threshold.

== Background ==
Building on research by Barbara Fredrickson suggesting that individuals with a higher ratio of positive to negative emotions tend to have more successful life outcomes, and on studies by Marcial Losada applying differential equations from fluid dynamics to human emotions, Fredrickson and Losada proposed as informative a ratio of positive to negative affect derived from nonlinear dynamics modelling (based on Lorenz systems), which appeared in 2005 in a paper in American Psychologist. The derived combination of expressions and default parameters led them to conclude that a critical ratio of positive to negative affect of exactly 2.9013 separated flourishing from languishing individuals, and to argue that the ideal positivity/negativity ratio lies between 2.9013 and an upper limit ratio of 11.6346. Hence, they claimed that their model predicted cut-off points for the minimum and maximum positivity ratios within which one should observe qualitative changes in an individual's level of flourishing, specifically, that those within this range of ratios would "flourish", and those outside would "languish". As of January 2014, the 2005 Fredrickson and Losada's paper had been cited more than 320 times in the psychology literature.

== Criticism ==
=== Initially ignored questioning ===
The first critical evaluation of the mathematical modeling behind the critical positivity ratio was published by a group of Finnish researchers—Luoma, Hämäläinen, and Saarinen of the Systems Analysis Laboratory at Aalto University—in 2008. The authors noted that "[o]nly very limited explanations are given about the modeling process and the meaning and interpretation of its parameters... [so that] the reasoning behind the model equations remains unclear to the reader"; moreover, they noted that "the model also produces strange and previously unreported behavior under certain conditions... [so that] the predictive validity of the model also becomes problematic." Not widely impactful at the time, Losada's earlier modeling article was also critiqued by Andrés Navas in a French language publication, a note in the CNRS publication, "Images des Mathématiques", which also failed to attract a wide readership. In their followup to Fredrickson's immediate response to the rebuttal, Brown, Sokal, and Friedman note as a footnote to their submission:

After the publication of Brown et al. (2013), Andrés Navas kindly drew our attention to his article (Navas, 2011) in which a very similar (though briefer) critique of Losada (1999) was made. [This footnote was unfortunately omitted from the published version of this article, due to space limitations.]

=== The Brown-Sokal-Friedman rebuttal ===
The Fredrickson and Losada work on modeling the positivity ratio aroused the skepticism of Nick Brown, a graduate student in applied positive psychology, who questioned whether such work could reliably make such broad claims, and perceived that the paper's mathematical claims were suspect. Brown contacted and ultimately collaborated with physics and maths professor Alan Sokal and psychology professor Friedman on a re-analysis of the paper's data. The result was a strong critique of the critical positivity ratio in its entirety by Brown, Sokal, and Friedman, that appeared in a 2013 article in American Psychologist, here referred to as the Brown-Sokal-Friedman rebuttal. These authors argued that Losada's conclusions in previous papers using modelling from fluid dynamics, and those in his paper co-authored with Fredrickson, were not only based on poorly reported experiments, but also that it was difficult to draw conclusions from Losada's previous cited studies because critical details were omitted, "interpretations of results [were] made with little or no justification", and that elementary errors were made in the application of differential equations.

Among the severe flaws claimed by Brown et al. in the positivity-ratio theory and its presentation were that:

- data used by Losada in several analyses do not meet basic criteria for the use of differential equations (such as the use of continuous variables that evolve smoothly and deterministically over time);
- differential equations used by Losada to calculate the critical positivity ratio use parameters taken directly from Lorenz's simplified, illustrative, and arbitrary models for fluid dynamics, with Losada giving no rationale for his choice of parameters;
- use of different arbitrary parameters would give different positivity ratios, and thus the precise values for the lower and upper critical ratios based on the arbitrary parameters, Fredrickson and Losada's 2.9013 to 11.6346 ratios, are meaningless;
- the butterfly-like first figure provided by Fredrickson and Losada is not a model of the data taken from their human participants, but "the results of computer simulations of the Lorenz equations, nothing more"; and
- based on the maths, even if precise positivity/negativity ratios could be derived, several "windows" of desirable and undesirable positivity/negativity ratios above a certain value should exist, rather than a simple range of ratios in which "flourishing" should occur.

With regard to these, and especially the last, the Brown-Sokal-Friedman rebuttal argues that it is likely that Fredrickson and Losada did not fully grasp the implications of applying nonlinear dynamics to their data. Brown, Sokal, and Friedman state that one can:

only marvel at the astonishing coincidence that human emotions should turn out to be governed by exactly the same set of equations that were derived in a celebrated article several decades ago as a deliberately simplified model of convection in fluids, and whose solutions happen to have visually appealing properties. An alternative explanation – and, frankly, the one that appears most plausible to us – is that the entire process of "derivation" of the Lorenz equations has been contrived to demonstrate an imagined fit between some rather limited empirical data and the scientifically impressive world of nonlinear dynamics.

They "urge future researchers to exercise caution in the use of advanced mathematical tools, such as nonlinear dynamics".

== Responses to the Brown-Sokal-Friedman rebuttal ==
=== Fredrickson and Am. Psychol. retraction ===
Fredrickson responded to the critique by agreeing that Losada's mathematical modelling was "questionable" and did not show that there are precise values of the ratio, but also arguing that the evidence for the benefits of a high positivity/negativity ratio is solid. Fredrickson noted that Losada declined to respond to the criticism. The American Psychologist proceeded to formally retract as invalid the mathematical modeling elements of Fredrickson and Losada's paper, including the specific critical positivity ratios of 2.9013 and its upper limit.

=== Other respondents ===
In a follow-up to the 2013 papers—the Brown-Sokal-Friedman rebuttal, and the Fredrickson response—American Psychologist published further scholarly responses, mostly supportive, but some critical of at least some aspects of the rebuttal. The series of responses culminated in a further response to these from Brown, Sokal, and Friedman. C.A. Nickerson, an independent scholar formerly at the University of Colorado, Boulder, concurred with the Brown-Sokal-Friedman rebuttal conclusion of the lack of empirical evidence for a critical positivity ratio, and noted the necessity of distinguishing between within-person-across-time versus within-time-across-persons theories. Emeritus professor Raimo Hämäläinen and colleagues responded, passing over the Brown-Sokal-Friedman rebuttal claims of failed criteria for use of differential equations in modeling, instead arguing that there were no fundamental errors in the mathematics itself, only problems related to the model's justification and interpretation.

=== Follow-up from Brown, Sokal, and Friedman ===
The original rebuttal authors were openly critical about Fredrickson's partial retraction, and American Psychologist published their response to it in 2014, where they emphatically argued that there was no evidence whatsoever, as of that date, for the existence of a critical positivity ratio (i.e., a tipping-point for positivity). In 2014, the rebuttal authors also responded to comments from others on their 2013 work,

- noting Nickerson's concurrence regarding the lack of empirical evidence for a critical positivity ratio, and lauding her distinction between the within-person and within-time types of theories, noting that "[b]oth types of theories are valuable... but... conceptually distinct and by no means equivalent" and that they believed that "this distinction deserves to be more widely discussed in the literature on research methods".
- noting that Hämäläinen, Luoma, and Saarinen "concede our main point, namely the complete lack of justification for the use of the Lorenz equations in modeling the time evolution of human emotions", but confronting the "no clear mathematical errors" assertion, stating that
  Among the purely mathematical errors clearly noted... are Fredrickson and Losada's assertion that the r = 22 data (alleged to be characteristic of “medium-performance teams”) end up in a limit cycle... and their implicit claims concerning the absence of chaotic attraction at large values of r... But we are happy to agree with Hämäläinen et al. that the central flaws in Fredrickson and Losada (2005) and its predecessor articles are logical and conceptual, not narrowly mathematical. And they are, as we have demonstrated, overwhelming.

The original rebuttal authors conclude this salvo by lamenting that the "unbridled romanticism" of which humanist psychology has been accused has not been replaced with a rigorous evidence-based psychology—as Seligman and Csikszentmihalyi promised in their founding manifesto of positive psychology—rather, the widespread acceptance of the critical positivity ratio shows that positive psychology has betrayed this promise, stating that "the sin is now romantic scientism rather than pure romanticism is not, in our view, a great advance."

== J. Humanist. Psychol. special issue, and other follow-up ==
As of January 2014, as Andrew Anthony notes from his preparation for his article in The Observer from that period, Fredrickson continued to maintain "on empirical grounds" that "tipping points [in relation to positive emotions and flourishing] are highly probable", as communicated to him via email.

In 2018, the Journal of Humanistic Psychology published a special issue focused on the aftermath to the rebuttal of the original Fredrickson and Losada article, where Harris L. Friedman and Nicholas J. L. Brown served as monitoring editors.

As of this date, the 2005 report of Fredrickson and Losada has been described as discredited.

== Popular discussion ==
The concept of a critical positivity ratio advanced by Fredrickson and Losada in 2005 was embraced by the lay public. Prior to the appearance of the Brown-Sokal-Friedman rebuttal and the ensuing retraction, Fredrickson had written a popular book, Positivity: Top-Notch Research Reveals the 3-to-1 Positivity Ratio that Will Change Your life. Andrew Anthony, writing for The Guardian in January 2014, noted that in it, Fredrickson had written, "Just as zero degrees Celsius is a special number in thermodynamics, the 3-to-1 positivity ratio may well be a magic number in human psychology." Anthony also noted that following the Brown-Sokal-Friedman rebuttal, Fredrickson has "removed the critical chapter that outlines Losada's input from further editions of Positivity", and that she has largely avoided engaging the popular press.

Reporting from a variety of sources, including The Chronicle of Higher Education and The Scientist, the fact that the problems with the critical positivity ratio paper and concept went unnoticed for years (despite widespread adulatory publicity) contributed to a public perception of social psychology being a field that lacks scientific soundness and rigorous critical thinking. Sokal would state that the paper's "main claim... is so implausible on its face that some red flags ought to have been raised", as would only happen broadly with graduate student Brown's initiating the collaboration that resulted in the Brown-Sokal-Friedman rebuttal.
