= Barbara Fredrickson =

American psychology professor

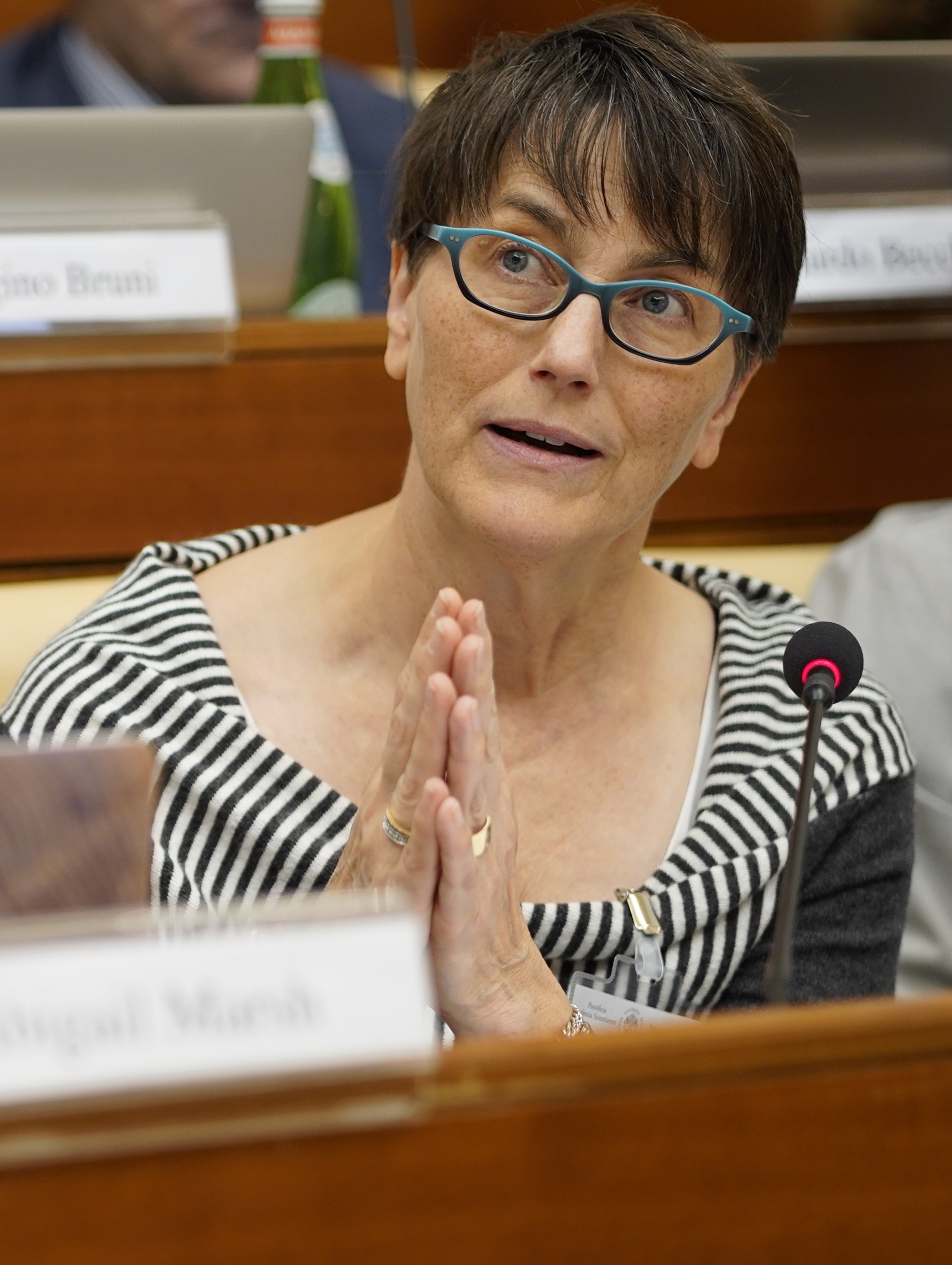
- Fredrickson at the Pontifical Academy of Sciences, 2019
- Born: June 15, 1964 (age 62)
- Awards: Society of Experimental Social Psychology's Career Trajectory Award; 2008 Inaugural Christopher Peterson Gold Medal; 2013 Toronto-based TANG Foundation's Prize; 2017

Academic background
- Thesis: Anticipated endings : an explanation for selective social interaction (1990)
- Doctoral advisor: Laura L. Carstensen

Academic work
- Discipline: Psychologist
- Sub-discipline: Social psychologist
- Institutions: University of North Carolina at Chapel Hill
- Notable works: Research in emotions and positive psychology
- Notable ideas: Broaden-and-build theory of positive emotions

Barbara Lee Fredrickson (born June 15, 1964) is an American professor in the department of psychology at the University of North Carolina at Chapel Hill, where she is the Kenan Distinguished Professor of Psychology. She is also the Principal Investigator of the Positive Emotions and Psychophysiology Lab (PEPLab) at the University of North Carolina at Chapel Hill.

Fredrickson is a social psychologist who conducts research in emotions and positive psychology. Her main work is related to her broaden-and-build theory of positive emotions, which suggests that positive emotions lead to novel, expansive, or exploratory behavior, and that, over time, these actions lead to meaningful, long-term resources such as knowledge and social relationships. She is the author of Positivity: Top-Notch Research Reveals the 3-to-1 Ratio That Will Change Your Life (2009), a general-audience book that draws on her own research and that of other social scientists. The book's thesis is largely drawn from her work with Marcial Losada, claiming a mathematical ratio for happiness. The ratio, however, was "based on a series of erroneous and, for the most part, completely illusory 'applications' of mathematics." Fredrickson was unable to reproduce the math behind her research published with Losada and in a later response the mathematical models for the paper were formally withdrawn.

== Research ==
=== Broaden-and-build ===
Central to many existing theories of emotion is the concept of specific-action tendencies – the idea that emotions prepare the body both physically and psychologically to act in particular ways. For example, anger creates the urge to attack, fear causes an urge to escape and disgust leads to the urge to expel. From this framework, positive emotions posed a puzzle. Emotions like joy, serenity and gratitude don't seem as useful as fear, anger or disgust. The bodily changes, urges to act and the facial expressions produced by positive emotions are not as specific or as obviously relevant to survival as those sparked by negative emotions. If positive emotions didn't promote our ancestors’ survival in life-threatening situations, then what good were they? How did they survive evolutionary pressures? Did they have any adaptive value at all? Barbara Fredrickson developed the Broaden-and-Build Theory of Positive Emotions to explain the mechanics of how positive emotions were important to survival.

=== Positivity/negativity ratio and prominent criticism ===
Fredrickson's 2005 paper, co-authored with Marcial Losada, argued that there exist precise values of an individual's emotional positivity-to-negativity ratio, outside of which they will fail to flourish. Fredrickson and Losada's use of nonlinear dynamics modelling, taken from fluid dynamics, to derive these values, has been strongly criticised by Nicholas Brown, Alan Sokal, and Harris Friedman, who point out numerous fundamental mathematical errors in the article (see Losada line). Fredrickson has agreed that the mathematical modelling is "questionable", but stands by the more general idea that a high emotional positivity-to-negativity ratio is beneficial. The whole theory of the critical positivity ratio was discredited by Nicholas Brown, Alan Sokal, and Harris Friedman, in a 2013 article published in American Psychologist, the same journal in which Fredrickson's original findings were published in 2005. Brown et al. argue that Losada's conclusions in previous papers using modelling from fluid dynamics, and those in his paper co-authored with Fredrickson, are not only based on poorly-reported experiments – they argue that it is difficult to draw any conclusions from some previous studies by Losada because critical details are omitted, and "interpretations of results are made with little or no justification" (p. 5) – but are based on elementary errors in the use of differential equations.

=== The undoing effect ===
Fredrickson and others hypothesize that positive emotions undo the cardiovascular effects of negative emotions. When people experience stress, they show increased heart rate, higher blood sugar, immunosuppression, and other adaptations optimized for immediate action. If individuals do not regulate these changes once the stress is past, they can lead to illness, such as coronary disease, and heightened mortality. Both lab research and survey research indicate that positive emotions help people who were previously under stress relax back to their physiological baseline.

Past research has shown that anger, fear and sadness each elicit distinct responses in the autonomic nervous system. In direct contrast, the positive emotions appeared to have no distinguishable autonomic responses. Positive emotions do not themselves generate cardiovascular reactivity, but instead quell any existing cardiovascular reactivity caused by negative emotions. Put differently, a prior state of negative emotional arousal may be a necessary backdrop to illuminate the cardiovascular impact of positive emotions. Assuming (as most emotion theorists do) that the cardiovascular reactivity sparked by certain negative emotions prepares the body for specific actions, the broaden-and-build theory suggests that positive emotions can speed recovery from—or undo—this cardiovascular reactivity and return the body to mid-range levels of activation suitable for pursuing a wider range of behavioral options. According to this view, positive emotions have a unique ability to down-regulate lingering negative emotions and the psychological and physiological states they generate. In one of the studies, they gave participants an acute stressor – the possibility of giving a public speech. As participants prepare for this speech their bodies exhibit increased sympathetic nervous system activation (sweaty palms, increased heart rate, increased blood pressure). After a minute or so of this heightened state of arousal, participants learn that they don't have to give the speech after all and instead view a randomly assigned video clip that generates a positive or negative emotion, or a state of neutrality. Fredrickson and colleagues measured the amount of time it took each person to recover from the anxiety about the possible speech. Results indicated that positive emotions led to a quicker return to a resting state than neutral or negative emotions. This is called the undoing effect.

=== Sex differences in self-objectification ===
Prior to her work on positive emotions, Fredrickson researched social and environmental cues that can carry sexist messages and enhance stereotypical gender differences. She found that when women are randomly assigned dress in a way that calls attention to their bodies, they show impaired performance on a math task and were literally more likely to "throw like a girl". This research suggested that drawing attention to women's bodies also activated stereotypical beliefs about their gender. She has also contributed to research for the Objectification Theory which posits that women internalize an outsider's point of view when viewing themselves and their bodies. She argues that this objectification of women's bodies may have contributed to the high prevalence of mental health risks that plague women.

=== Loving-kindness meditation ===
As a means to test the build hypothesis, central to the broad-and-build theory, Fredrickson and colleagues assessed the impact of learning to self-generate positive emotions by learning loving-kindness meditation (LKM), an ancient Buddhist mind-training practice. A paper published in 2008 showed that LKM produces enduring increases in positive emotions, which in turn builds a range of consequential personal resources that augment life satisfaction and curb depressive symptoms. A paper published in 2013 also shows that LKM, by increasing positive emotions and perceived positive social connections, improves cardiovascular health.

== Recognition ==
Fredrickson received the American Psychological Association's inaugural Templeton Prize in Positive Psychology in 2000 for her work on the broaden-and-build theory, which included a $100,000 grant to fund her work. Her work has been supported continuously for the past 16 years by grants from the National Institutes of Health. She also received the Society of Experimental Social Psychology's Career Trajectory Award in 2008. She was awarded the inaugural Christopher Peterson Gold Medal in 2013. In November 2017, Fredrikson was awarded the Toronto-based TANG Foundation's Prize for Psychology, including a $100,000 (Canadian) grant.

== Selected publications ==
- Fredrickson, Barbara (2009). Positivity: Top-Notch Research Reveals the 3-to-1 Ratio That Will Change Your Life. New York: Crown.
- Fredrickson, Barbara (2013). Love 2.0. New York: Hudson Street Press.
- Fredrickson, B. L. (2013). Updated thinking on the positivity ratio. American Psychologist, 68, 814–822.
- Fredrickson, B. L. (2013). Positive emotions broaden and build. In E. Ashby Plant & P. G. Devine (Eds.), Advances on Experimental Social Psychology, 47, 1-53. Burlington: Academic Press.
- Fredrickson, B. L., Grewen, K. M., Coffey, K. A., Algoe, S. B., Firestine, A. M., Arevalo, J. M. G., Ma, J., & Cole, S. W. (2013). A functional genomic perspective on human well-being. Proceedings of the National Academy of Sciences, 110, 13684–13689.
- Fredrickson, B. L., Cohn, M. A., Coffey, K. A., Pek, J., & Finkel, S. M. (2008). Open hearts build lives: Positive emotions, induced through loving-kindness meditation, build consequential personal resources. Journal of Personality and Social Psychology, 95, 1045–1062.
- Fredrickson, B. L. & Losada, M. (2005). Positive affect and the complex dynamics of human flourishing. American Psychologist, 60, 678–686.
- Fredrickson, B. L., & Branigan, C. (2005). Positive emotions broaden the scope of attention and thought-action repertoires. Cognition and Emotion, 19, 313–332.
- Fredrickson, B. L. (2003). The value of positive emotions. American Scientist, 91, 330–335.
- Fredrickson, B. L. (2001). The role of positive emotions in positive psychology: The broaden-and-build theory of positive emotions. American Psychologist, 56, 218–226.
- Fredrickson, B. L. (2000). Cultivating positive emotions to optimize health and well-being. Target article in Prevention and Treatment, 3.
- Fredrickson, B. L. (1998). What good are positive emotions? Review of General Psychology, 2, 300–319.
- Fredrickson, B. L., & Roberts, T.-A. (1997). Objectification theory: Toward understanding women's lived experiences and mental health risks. Psychology of Women Quarterly, 21, 173–206.

== Sources ==
- Anthony, Andrew (18 January 2014). "The British amateur who debunked the mathematics of happiness". The Guardian.
