= Nathan O. Sokal =

American electronics engineer (1929–2016)

- Born: February 1, 1929; Brooklyn, New York City, U.S.
- Died: May 8, 2016 (aged 87); Newton, Massachusetts
- Education: Stuyvesant High School
- Alma mater: Massachusetts Institute of Technology
- Known for: Class E RF power amplifiers
- Children: 3, including Alan
- Scientific career
- Fields: Electrical engineering
- Workplaces: Philco; Massachusetts Institute of Technology; MIT Lincoln Laboratory; Design Automation, Inc.
- Thesis: Area display of obstacle location for use with a guidance device for the blind (1950)

Nathan O. Sokal (February 1, 1929 – May 8, 2016) was an American electrical engineer and inventor. He is best known for his contribution to the design of RF power amplifiers and the development of class E power amplifiers.

== Biography ==
Sokal was born in 1929 in Brooklyn. He was born to a family of Polish-Jewish descent who emigrated to the United States in 1924. His parents were medical doctors. Attending Stuyvesant High School in the 1940s, he received B.S. and S.M degrees in electrical engineering in 1950 from Massachusetts Institute of Technology; his masters studies were advised by O. H. Straus. During his studies in MIT, he was a co-op student and worked at Philco during alternate semesters. His work at Philco ranged from the design of control and electronics units for radar systems to the electrical testing of loudspeakers and thyratrons. In 1952, He married Zelda Kaufman Sokal, a fellow New Yorker and a student at Radcliffe College. They had three children: physicist and professor Alan Sokal, Karen Sokal-Gutierrez and Diane Sokal.

Following his graduation, Sokol held engineering and supervisory positions in various companies, including Mack Trucks and Sylvania Electric Products. He became a staff member at MIT, and served as a United States Air Force lieutenant from 1954 to 1956. During his tenure at Holmes and Narver, Inc., he worked on instrumentation and data recording of blast effects for nuclear tests at Enewetak Atoll. Subsequently, he became an engineer at MIT Lincoln Laboratory, where he worked on the design, manufacturing, installation and operation of analog and digital equipment. In 1965, he founded the electronics consulting firm Design Automation, Inc., which provided product design, design review and redesign, and technology development, particularly on power electronics for switching mode power conversion and amplification below 2.5 GHz frequencies.

Sokal is best known for his work on high-efficiency RF power amplifiers, which was motivated by his interest in amateur radio. In the 1970s, he, along with his son Alan, introduced the class E switching-mode power amplifier. Sokal also invented a high-efficiency linear RF power amplifier using envelope elimination and restoration. His inventions were subject to multiple patents. In 1989, he was elected as an IEEE fellow for his contributions to the technology of high-efficiency power conversion and RF power amplification. In 2007, he, along with his son Alan, received the Microwave Pioneer Award "in recognition of a major, lasting contribution of the development of the class-E high-efficiency switching-mode RF power amplifier." In 2007, he received an honorary doctorate from Technical University of Madrid for his work on RF power amplifiers.

Sokal died on 8 May 2016 in Newton, Massachusetts, and was survived by his wife, three children and six grandchildren.

== Selected publications ==
Books

- Grebennikov, Andrei; Franco, Marc J.; Sokal, Nathan O. (2012). Switchmode RF and Microwave Power Amplifiers. Academic Press. ISBN 0080550649.

Journal articles

- Sokal, N. O; Sokal, A. D. (1975). "Class E-A new class of high-efficiency tuned single-ended switching power amplifiers". IEEE Journal of Solid-State Circuits. 10 (3): 168–176. doi:10.1109/JSSC.1975.1050582.
- Raab, F. H.; Sokal, N. O. (1978). "Transistor power losses in the class E tuned power amplifier". IEEE Journal of Solid-State Circuits. 13 (6): 912–914. doi:10.1109/JSSC.1978.1052069.
- Sokal, N. O. (1981). "Class E high-efficiency switching-mode tuned power amplifier with only one inductor and one capacitor in load network-approximate analysis". IEEE Journal of Solid-State Circuits. 16 (4): 380–384. doi:10.1109/JSSC.1981.1051605.
- Redl, Richard; Molnar, Bela; Sokal, Nathan O. (1986). "Class E resonant regulated DC/DC power converters: analysis of operations, and experimental results at 1.5 MHz". IEEE Transactions on Power Electronics. PE-1 (2): 111–120. doi:10.1109/TPEL.1986.4766289.
- Redl, R.; Sokal, N.O.; Balogh, L. (1991). "A novel soft-switching full-bridge DC/DC converter: analysis, design considerations, and experimental results at 1.5 kW, 100 kHz". IEEE Transactions on Power Electronics. 6 (3): 408–418. doi:10.1109/63.85909.
- Raab, F. H.; Asbeck, P.; Cripps, S.; Kenington, P. B.; Popovic, Z. B.; Pothecary, N.; Sevic, J. F.; Sokal, N. O. (2002). "Power amplifiers and transmitters for RF and microwave". IEEE Transactions on Microwave Theory and Techniques. 50 (3): 814–826. doi:10.1109/22.989965.

Patents

- US patent 3900823, Nathan O. Sokal & Alan D. Sokal, "Amplifying and processing apparatus for modulated carrier signals", issued August 15, 1975
- US patent 3919656, Nathan O. Sokal & Alan D. Sokal, "High-efficiency tuned switching power amplifier", issued November 11, 1975
- US patent 4607323, Nathan O. Sokal; Richard Redl & Bela Molnar, "Class E high-frequency high-efficiency DC/DC power converter", issued August 19, 1986
- US patent 4719559, Nathan O. Sokal & Richard Redl, "Current-mode control of capacitively coupled power converters", issued January 12, 1988
- US patent 4928200, Richard Redl & Nathan O. Sokal, "Overcurrent protection for switching mode power converter", issued May 22, 1990
- US patent 5485361, Nathan O. Sokal, "Flyback charging with current mode controlled flyback converter", issued January 16, 1996
