= Broaden-and-build =

Theory of positive emotions

The broaden-and-build theory in positive psychology suggests that positive emotions broaden one's awareness and encourage novel, exploratory thoughts and actions. Over time, this broadened behavioral repertoire builds useful skills and multiple resources, including physical, intellectual, social, and psychological resources. The theory was developed by Barbara Fredrickson around 1998. In later work, Fredrickson identifies 10 key positive emotions, including joy, gratitude, serenity, interest, hope, pride, amusement, inspiration, awe, and love.

== Theoretical mechanisms ==
Positive emotions have no immediate survival value, because they take one's mind off immediate needs and stressors. Since the context that generates positive emotions will not be life-threatening, people don't need to focus only on thoughts and actions that provide immediate benefits. Instead, these positive emotions broaden the momentary thought-action repertoire and widen the number of choices and thoughts that can come to a person’s mind. For example, interest broadens the repertoire by initiating the urge to explore new information and experiences, and to absorb this new knowledge; joy broadens the repertoire by creating the urge to explore beyond previous boundaries, try new things, and be more creative in the process; pride (triggered by personal achievements) broadens the repertoire by generating the urge to share the news with others, and to imagine achieving even greater accomplishments in the future. Fredrickson also argued that these urges not only appear in physical and social behaviors, but also in intellectual and artistic behaviors.

This is in contrast to negative emotions, which prompt narrow, survival-oriented behaviors that can result in quick and immediate responses. For example, anxiety leads to the specific fight-or-flight response. A limited number of urges, called specific action tendencies, quicken response times. This can result in immediate benefits in a life-threatening scenario.

Although a broadened thought-action repertoire does not carry immediate benefits, this repertoire, widened by positive emotions, can bring long-term benefits in the future, as the broadening process builds and accumulates personal resources that can be used in future situations. For example, play, an urge associated with joy, can lead to several personal resources, including physical resources, social resources, and intellectual resources. Chasing play in young animals, such as using flexible branches to launch themselves in an unexpected direction, is similar to the predator avoidance behaviors seen when they grow up. Also, the excitement and happiness in social play creates enduring social bonds and attachments, which lay the foundation for future social support. Moreover, playing behaviors in childhood can promote brain development, develop the theory of mind (the ability to understand that others have different thoughts and perspectives), and make children more creative. Other positive emotions, such as interest and pride, can also enhance one’s physical, social, intellectual, and psychological resources.

According to Fredrickson, the resources gained through positive emotions outlive the emotions from which they were acquired. Resources build up over time and increase the individual's overall well-being. This forms a positive cycle: increased well-being leads to more positive emotions which lead to higher resilience, which leads to increased well-being. Happiness, then, is not only the result of success and high-functioning behavior, but also a precondition for it.

== Later development ==
Fredrickson's original broaden-and-build theory focused solely on how positive emotions broaden one's attention. Later theorists give more weight to the importance of psychological narrowing in addition to broadening when building personal resources. Narrowing is typically associated with negative emotions, but their adverse effects can be counterbalanced by positive emotions. Therefore, the beneficial aspects of narrowing can be experienced without harmful effects if both positive and negative emotions are experienced in proportion.

The creative process is often studied in relation to this, as it involves a widening of the mind, building of personal resources, and both sides of the emotional spectrum.

A 2005 study found that naturally creative people experience wider mood swings, spending a lot of time in both positive and negative emotional spaces depending on what they are trying to accomplish at the time. Too much time on either side can be detrimental: excessive positive emotions without an appropriate counterbalance can make people aloof and unfocused.

The creative process is often discussed in two stages: defocused attention, followed by focused attention.

Defocused attention occurs when a person is able to see a wide range of possibilities and take in as much information as possible. Focused attention takes place when more negative emotions are felt and causes people to analyze the possibilities they found during defocused attention. Without this process, concrete ideas do not form.

The whole-brain hypothesis of creativity also promotes the importance of psychological narrowing. The theory states that the defocused stage uses a greater portion of the right side of the brain, whereas the focused process uses more of the left side. Creativity necessitates communication between the two hemispheres to form coherent theories and develop personal skills.

== Support ==
Fredrickson has conducted randomized controlled lab studies in which participants are randomly assigned to watch films that induce positive emotions such as joy and contentment, negative emotions such as fear and anger, or no emotions. Then, Fredrickson and her colleagues asked participants to write down things that they would like to do “right then” under those emotions. Participants who experience positive emotions list significantly more actions than those in the neutral or negative conditions. In contrast, fear and anger lead to fewer listed actions than the neutral condition. This is supported by a previous positive affect experiment conducted by Isen and colleagues, which showed that participants who experience positive emotions show heightened creativity, inventiveness, and "big picture" perceptual focus. Longitudinal intervention studies show that positive emotions help develop long-term resources such as psychological resilience and flourishing. Positive emotions do not just signify current thriving: they can also create broader thought-action repertoires, which lead to increased resources and more satisfied lives.

=== Undoing the aftereffects of negative emotions ===
Based on the broadening process, Fredrickson and her colleagues develop the “undoing hypothesis” (also called the undoing effect). Fredrickson argued that since positive emotions can widen the repertoire narrowed by negative emotions, then positive emotions can reverse the aftereffects caused by negative emotions, including the preparation of a certain action, such as the fight-or-flight response. This incompatibility has been observed in many other areas, including anxiety disorders, motivation, and aggression. Although the mechanism under this incompatibility is still unclear, Fredrickson argued that the broadening process might be one of the underlying factors that play a role in it.

Fredrickson and her colleagues tested the undoing hypothesis by using a time-pressured speech preparation task that can activate high levels of negative emotion. All participants believed that their speech would be recorded and reviewed by their peers, which induced anxiety, followed by physiological symptoms such as increased heart rate and blood pressure. Then, participants were randomly assigned to watch one of the four films: two induced mild positive emotions (joy and contentment), one served as the control condition (neutral), and the last one induced negative emotion (sadness). Researchers measured the time from the start of the film until cardiovascular responses returned to the baseline.

Researchers discovered that participants who watched positive emotion films showed significantly faster cardiovascular recovery than those who watched neutral films, and participants who watched the sadness film showed the slowest recovery rate. They also noticed that although positive emotion films and the neutral film did not differ in their cardiovascular effects at rest, they differed significantly in their ability to undo the cardiovascular aftereffects elicited by negative emotion.

=== Meditation and the hedonic treadmill ===
A 2008 study found that meditation, and more specifically loving-kindness meditation, can help generate the positive emotions needed to build personal resources. In this type of meditation, a participant first considers a person they already think of in a 'warm' way. They then expand their focus and positive feelings first to themselves, then to a widening array of people.

The hedonic treadmill theory argues that positive emotions are always temporary, and that people must constantly search for new ways to experience positivity as old techniques become ineffective.

The study was performed over a nine-week period, which let researchers see that loving-kindness meditation did not develop positive emotions immediately, but over time. The slow progression provided evidence that the positive effects built resources that allowed for more positive experience in the future. A broaden-and-build approach to positive emotions sidesteps this: positive emotions do not directly contribute to life satisfaction (and as a result lose their effectiveness over time), but instead build beneficial psychological resources which can be drawn upon for extended periods of time.

=== Writing about positive emotions ===
A 2004 study found that writing about intensely positive experiences improved subjects' happiness and health.

For twenty minutes per day over three days, subjects wrote about an intensely positive experience while a control group wrote about a neutral topic. The experimental group demonstrated increased happiness compared to the control. The experimental group also visited the doctor's office far less often than the control group over the following three months. Subjects who wrote about positive experiences were able to relive past positive emotions, and use them to broaden their experiences and build relationships and skills.

=== Religions ===
According to a 2002 study, people who participate in certain religious practices enjoy benefits similar to those from experiencing positive emotions. Certain religious practices are beneficial because they are "built on a belief of greater meaning in life". As a result, people are able to find meaning in anything from chance occurrences, such as running into an old friend in the store, to extreme hardships, such as losing a spouse. This belief in greater meaning helps cultivate positive emotions, which led to greater resilience, creativity, wisdom, virtue, physical health and social integration.

== Criticism ==
A 2010 study by Gable and Harmon-Jones found that exposing subjects to certain negative emotions increased the breadth of their attention, rather than decreasing it. This gave credence to the motivational dimensional model:

According to this model, some positive emotions are low in approach motivation, like contentment. That is, they do not compel individuals to initiate some behavior or act immediately. These positive emotions, consistent with broaden and build theory, broaden attention. In this state, individuals attend to many objects or to abstract concepts. In contrast, other positive emotions, like excitement, are high in approach motivation. These emotions compel individuals to initiate some act. These positive emotions, contrary to broaden and build theory, narrow attention. Presumably, as individuals approach an object, they have evolved to disregard irrelevant distracters.

Prior studies by the researchers found similar results: participants who watched films about desirable desserts faced narrowed attention, and a 2009 neurophysiological study found that activation of the left prefrontal cortex is associated with both approach motivation and psychological narrowing.

However, the validity of the motivational dimensional model has recently been seriously challenged due to an overwhelming degree of overlap with valence (questioning whether it is a distinct concept at all) and confounded operationalisations in the literature.

Besides these challenges, the number of studies that test all components of the broaden-and-build theory remains limited, but one network analytic study conducted by Roth and colleagues challenged the validity of the broadening component. They used two independent studies (total N = 641) and measured life satisfaction as the final outcome. Across both studies, positive emotions, personal resources, and life satisfaction showed a robust positive correlation. Nevertheless, the broadening component consistently failed to perform as predicted. It did not act as the intermediary step between positive emotions and personal resources and outcomes; the broadening measures showed either no correlation or only weak relationships with other variables in the model. In addition, researchers argued that there was a direct relationship between positive emotions, personal resources (building), and the final outcome (higher life satisfaction). Therefore, they concluded that the current version of the broaden-and-build theory needs to be refined, and they suggested improving the broadening measure.

However, the authors acknowledged several limitations, including the arbitrary selection of measures for each component, the low reliability of the broadening measure, and the cross-sectional nature of the study, which limits interpretability as the theory includes temporal components.

== See also ==
- Subjective well-being
- Writing therapy
