= Positive affectivity =

Psychological capability to respond positively

Positive affectivity (PA) is a human characteristic that describes how much people experience positive affects (sensations, emotions, sentiments); and as a consequence how they interact with others and with their surroundings.

People with high positive affectivity are typically enthusiastic, energetic, confident, active, and alert. Research has linked positive affectivity with an increase in longevity, better sleep, and a decrease in stress hormones. People with a high positive affectivity have healthier coping styles, more positive self-qualities, and are more goal oriented. Positive affectivity also promotes an open-minded attitude, sociability, and helpfulness.

Those having low levels of positive affectivity (and high levels of negative affectivity) are characterized by sadness, lethargy, distress, and un-pleasurable engagement (see negative affectivity). Low levels of positive affect are correlated with social anxiety and depression, due to decreased levels of dopamine.

== Psychology ==
Happiness, a feeling of well-being, and high levels of self-esteem are often associated with high levels of positive affectivity, but they are each influenced by negative affectivity as well. Trait PA roughly corresponds to the dominant personality factors of extraversion; however, this construct is also influenced by interpersonal components.

Positive affectivity has also been linked to improvements in cognitive processing in early development. Research in developmental psychology shows that children experiencing higher levels of positive emotion tend to engage in more systematic and explanation-based reasoning. For example, Bailey, Williams, and Cimpian (2022) found that positive affect was associated with a greater tendency to seek coherent, rule-based explanations when learning from examples, suggesting that positive emotional states may support deeper conceptual processing in childhood.

=== Effects ===
Overall, positive affect results in a more positive outlook, increases problem solving skills, increases social skills, increases activity and projects, and can play a role in motor function.

Positive affectivity is an integral part of everyday life. PA helps individuals to process emotional information accurately and efficiently, to solve problems, to make plans, and to earn achievements. The broaden-and-build theory of PA suggests that PA broadens people's momentary thought-action repertoires and builds their enduring personal resources.

Research shows that PA relates to different classes of variables, such as social activity and the frequency of pleasant events. PA also strongly relates to life satisfaction. The high energy and engagement, optimism, and social interest characteristic of high-PA individuals suggest that they are more likely to be satisfied with their lives. In fact, the content similarities between these affective traits and life satisfaction have led some researchers to view both PA, NA, and life satisfaction as specific indicators of the broader construct of subjective well-being.

PA may influence the relationships between variables in organizational research. PA increases attentional focus and behavioral repertoire, and these enhanced personal resources can help to overcome or deal with distressing situations. These resources are physical (e.g., better health), social (e.g., social support networks), and intellectual and psychological (e.g., resilience, optimism, and creativity).

PA provides a psychological break or respite from stress, supporting continued efforts to replenish resources depleted by stress. Its buffering functions provide a useful antidote to the problems associated with negative emotions and ill health due to stress, as PA reduces allostatic load. Likewise, happy people are better at coping. McCrae and Costa concluded that PA was associated with more mature coping efforts.

=== Negative affectivity ===
Positive affectivity (PA) and negative affectivity (NA) are nearly independent of each other; it is possible for a person to be high in both PA and NA, high in one and low in the other, or low in both. Affectivity has been found to be moderately stable over time and across situations (such as working versus relaxing). Positive affectivity may influence an individual's choices in general, particularly their responses to questionnaires.

== Neuropsychology ==
Studies are finding there is a relationship between dopamine release and positive affect in cognitive abilities. For instance, when dopamine levels are low, positive affect can stimulate the release of more dopamine, temporarily increasing cognitive, motor, and emotional processing. Stimulating dopamine release influences several cognitive functions. First, an increase in dopamine in the nigrostriatal system can temporarily relieve motor or cognitive dysfunction, due to Parkinson's.

An increase in dopamine release also influences the mesocorticolimbic system through the VTA cells, increasing mood and open mindedness in older adults. Positive affect also stimulates dopamine production in the prefrontal cortex and the anterior cingulate facilities, which help with processing working memory and executive attention. Lastly, PA indirectly improves memory consolidation in the hippocampus, by increasing acetylcholine release from an increase in dopamine.

== Business management ==
Positive affectivity is a managerial and organizational behavior tool used to create positive environments in the workplace. Through the use of PA, the manager can induce a positive employee experience and culture. "Since affectivity is related to the employee experiences, we expect the employees with high PA to feel considerable organizational support. Their optimism and confidence also helps them discuss their views in a manner characterized by constructive controversy with their supervisor, so that problems are solved and their positive feelings confirmed". Positive Affectivity allows creative problem solving to flourish in an environment where employees are not intimidated to approach managers, therefore employees believe they are playing a key role in the organization in coming forward with solutions. The goal is to maximize PA and minimize any negative affectivity circulating in the business. Negative emotions, such as fear, anger, stress, hostility, sadness, and guilt, increase the predictability of workplace deviance, and therefore reduce the productivity of the business.

== Testing ==
Because there is not a hard-and-fast rule for defining certain levels of positive affectivity, different self-reported assessments use different scales of measure. Several prominent tests are listed below; in each of these, the respondent determines the degree to which a given adjective or phrase accurately characterizes him or her.

- Differential Emotions Scale (DES): A PA scale that assesses enjoyment (happy or joyful feelings) and interest (excitement, alertness, curiosity).
- Multiple Affect Adjective Checklist – Revised (MAACL-R): Measures PA according to the DES scale and to an additional scale assessing thrill-seeking behavior (i.e., how daring or adventurous the person is).
- Profile of Mood States (POMS): Uses vigor scale to assess the domain of PA.
- Expanded Form of the Positive and Negative Affect Schedule (PANAS-X): This test uses three main scales: joviality (how cheerful, happy, or lively), self-assurance (how confident and strong), and attentiveness (alertness and concentration).
- International Positive and Negative Affect Schedule Short-Form (I-PANAS-SF): This is a brief, 10-item version of the PANAS that has been developed and extensively validated for use in English with both native and non-native English speakers. Internal consistency reliability for the 5-item PA scale is reported to range between .72 and .78.

== See also ==
- Affection
- Anhedonia
- Gratitude
- Happiness
- Joy
- Satisfaction
- Surgency
