= Power amplifier classes =

Classification of power amplifier

In electronics, power amplifier classes are letter symbols applied to different power amplifier types. The class gives a broad indication of an amplifier's efficiency, linearity and other characteristics.

Broadly, as you go through the alphabet, the amplifiers become more efficient but less linear, and the reduced linearity is dealt with through other means.

The first classes, A, AB, B, and C, are related to the time period that the active amplifier device is passing current, expressed as a fraction of the period of a signal waveform applied to the input. This metric is known as conduction angle ($\theta$). A class-A amplifier is conducting through the entire period of the signal ($\theta=360^\circ$), class-B only for one-half the input period ($\theta=180^\circ$), and class-C for much less than half the input period ($\theta \ll 180^\circ$). Class AB is between class A and class B ($360^\circ > \theta > 180^\circ$);

Class-D and E amplifiers operate their output device in a switching manner; the fraction of the time that the device is conducting may be adjusted so a pulse-width modulation output (or other frequency based modulation) can be obtained from the stage.

Additional letter classes are defined for special-purpose amplifiers, with additional active elements, power supply improvements, or output tuning; sometimes a new letter symbol is also used by a manufacturer to promote its proprietary design.

By December 2010, classes AB and D dominated nearly all of the audio amplifier market with the former being favored in portable music players, home audio and cell phone owing to lower cost of class-AB chips.

In the illustrations below, a bipolar junction transistor is shown as the amplifying device. However, the same attributes are found with MOSFETs or vacuum tubes.

== Class A ==
Class-A amplifier

In a class-A amplifier, 100% of the input signal is used (conduction angle $\theta=360$°). The active element remains continuously conducting. Their output stage transistors are biased for class-A operation, leading to a continual drain current. This means class-A amplifiers have poor efficiency and heat is generated in the transistor, typically requiring thermal management.

Subclasses A1 and A2 are sometimes used to refer to vacuum-tube class-A amplifiers that drive the grid slightly negative or positive respectively on signal peaks for slightly more power than normal class-A. This, however, incurs higher signal distortion.

=== Advantages of class-A amplifiers ===
- Simplicity. Class-A amplifiers are typically single-ended, requiring just a single device. The usual push–pull output configuration for class-AB and -B amplifiers requires two connected devices in the circuit, one to handle each half of the waveform.
- The amplifying element is biased so the device is always conducting, the quiescent (small-signal) collector current (for BJTs; drain current for FETs or anode/plate current for vacuum tubes) is close to the most linear portion of its transconductance curve.
- Because the device operates continuously there is no "turn on" time, no problems with charge storage, and generally better high-frequency performance and feedback loop stability (and usually fewer high-order harmonics).
- The point where the device comes closest to being 'off' is not at 'zero signal', so the problems of crossover distortion associated with class-AB and -B designs is avoided.
- Good for amplifying the weak signals received by radio receivers due to low distortion.

=== Disadvantage of class-A amplifiers ===
- Class-A amplifiers are inefficient. A maximum theoretical efficiency of 25% is obtainable using usual configurations, but 50% is the maximum for a transformer or inductively coupled configuration. In a power amplifier, this not only wastes power and limits operation with batteries, but increases operating costs and requires higher-rated output devices. Inefficiency comes from the standing current, which must be roughly half the maximum output current, and a large part of the power supply voltage is present across the output device at low signal levels. If high output power is needed from a class-A circuit, the power supply and accompanying heat becomes significant. For every watt delivered to the load, the amplifier itself, at best, uses an extra watt. For high-power amplifiers this means very large and expensive power supplies and heat sinks.
- Because the output devices are in full operation at all times (unlike a class A/B amplifier), they will not have as long a life unless the amplifier is specifically designed to take this into account, adding to the cost of maintaining or designing the amplifier.

Class-A power amplifier designs have largely been superseded by more efficient designs, though their simplicity makes them popular with some hobbyists. There is a market for expensive high fidelity class-A amps considered a "cult item" among audiophiles mainly for their absence of crossover distortion and reduced odd-harmonic and high-order harmonic distortion. Class-A power amplifiers are also used in some "boutique" guitar amplifiers due to their unique tonal quality and for reproducing vintage tones.

=== Single-ended and triode class-A amplifiers ===
Some hobbyists who prefer class-A amplifiers also prefer the use of thermionic valve (tube) designs instead of transistors, for several reasons:

- Single-ended output stages have an asymmetrical transfer characteristics curve, meaning that even-order harmonics in the created distortion tend to not cancel out (as they do in push–pull output stages). For tubes, or FETs, most distortion is second-order harmonics, from the square law transfer characteristic, which to some produces a "warmer" and more pleasant sound.
- For those who prefer low distortion figures, the use of tubes with class A (generating little odd-harmonic distortion, as mentioned above) together with symmetrical circuits (such as push–pull output stages, or balanced low-level stages) results in the cancellation of most of the even distortion harmonics, hence the removal of most of the distortion.
- Historically, valve amplifiers were often used as a class-A power amplifier simply because valves are large and expensive; many class-A designs use only a single device.

Transistors are much less expensive than tubes so more elaborate designs that use more parts are still less expensive to manufacture than tube designs. A classic application for a pair of class-A devices is the long-tailed pair, which is exceptionally linear, and forms the basis of many more complex circuits, including many audio amplifiers and almost all op-amps.

Class-A amplifiers may be used in output stages of op-amps (although the accuracy of the bias in low cost op-amps such as the "741" may result in class-A or class-AB or class-B performance, varying from device to device or with temperature). They are sometimes used as medium-power, low-efficiency, and high-cost audio power amplifiers. The power consumption is unrelated to the output power. At idle (no input), the power consumption is essentially the same as at high output volume. The result is low efficiency and high heat dissipation.

== Class B ==
Ideal class-B (push–pull) amplifier. In practice, distortion occurs near the crossover point.

In a class-B amplifier, the active device conducts for 180 degrees of the cycle (conduction angle θ = 180°). Because only half the waveform is amplified, significant harmonic distortion is directly present in the output signal. Therefore, class-B amplifiers are generally operated with tuned loading - where harmonics are shorted to ground by a series of resonators. Another method of reducing distortion, especially at audio frequencies, is to use two transistor devices in a push-pull configuration. Each conducts for one half (180°) of the signal cycle, and the device currents are combined so that the load current is continuous.

At radio frequency, if the coupling to the load is via a tuned circuit, a single device operating in class B can be used because the stored energy in the tuned circuit supplies the "missing" half of the waveform. Devices operating in class-B are used in linear amplifiers, so called because the radio frequency output power is proportional to the square of the input excitation voltage. This is more easily understood if stated as "output voltage is proportional to input voltage, thus output power is proportional to input power." This characteristic prevents distortion of amplitude-modulated or frequency-modulated signals passing through the amplifier. Such amplifiers have an efficiency around 60%.

When Class-B amplifiers amplify the signal with two active devices, each operates over one half of the cycle. Efficiency is much improved over class-A amplifiers. Class-B amplifiers are also favoured in battery-operated devices, such as transistor radios. Class-B has a maximum theoretical efficiency of π/4 (≈ 78.5%).

A practical circuit using class-B elements is the push–pull stage, such as the very simplified complementary pair arrangement shown at right. Complementary devices are each used for amplifying the opposite halves of the input signal, which is then recombined at the output. This arrangement gives good efficiency, but usually suffers from the drawback that there is a small mismatch in the cross-over region – at the "joins" between the two halves of the signal, as one output device has to take over supplying power exactly as the other finishes. This is called crossover distortion. An improvement is to bias the devices so they are not completely off when they are not in use. This approach is called class AB operation.

== Class AB ==
Ideal class-AB amplifier

In a class-AB amplifier, the conduction angle is intermediate between class-A and -B (conduction angle θ > 180°); each one of the two active elements conducts more than half of the time. Class-AB is widely considered a good compromise for amplifiers, since many types of input signal are nominally quiet enough to stay in the "class-A" region, where they are amplified with good fidelity, and by definition if passing out of this region, will be large enough that the distortion products typical of class-B will be relatively small. The crossover distortion can be reduced further by using negative feedback.

In class-AB operation, each device operates the same way as in class-B over half the waveform, but also conducts a small amount on the other half. As a result, the region where both devices simultaneously are nearly off (the "dead zone") is reduced. The result is that when the waveforms from the two devices are combined, the crossover is greatly minimised or eliminated altogether. The exact choice of quiescent current (the standing current through both devices when there is no signal) makes a large difference to the level of distortion (and to the risk of thermal runaway, which may damage the devices). Often, bias voltage applied to set this quiescent current must be adjusted with the temperature of the output transistors. (For example, in the circuit shown at right, the diodes would be mounted physically close to the output transistors, and specified to have a matched temperature coefficient.) Another approach (often used with thermally tracking bias voltages) is to include small value resistors in series with the emitters.

Class-AB sacrifices some efficiency over class-B in favor of linearity, thus is less efficient (below 78.5% for full-amplitude sine waves in transistor amplifiers, typically; much less is common in class-AB vacuum-tube amplifiers). It is typically much more efficient than class-A.

== Suffix numbers for vacuum tube amplifiers ==
A vacuum tube amplifier design will sometimes have an additional suffix number for the class, for example, class-B1. A suffix 1 indicates that grid current does not flow during any part of the input waveform, where a suffix 2 indicates grid current flows for part of the input waveform. This distinction affects the design of the driver stages for the amplifier. Suffix numbers are not used for semiconductor amplifiers.

== Class C ==
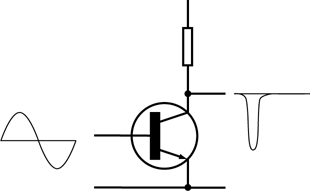
Class-C amplifier

In a class-C amplifier, less than 50% of the input signal is used (conduction angle θ < 180°). Distortion is high and practical use requires a tuned circuit as load. Efficiency can reach 80% in radio-frequency applications.

The usual application for class-C amplifiers is in RF transmitters operating at a single fixed carrier frequency, where the distortion is controlled by a tuned load on the amplifier. The input signal is used to switch the active device, causing pulses of current to flow through a tuned circuit forming part of the load.

The class-C amplifier has two modes of operation: tuned and untuned. The diagram shows a waveform from a simple class-C circuit without the tuned load. This is called untuned operation, and the analysis of the waveforms shows the massive distortion that appears in the signal. When the proper load (e.g., an inductive-capacitive filter plus a load resistor) is used, two things happen. The first is that the output's bias level is clamped with the average output voltage equal to the supply voltage. This is why tuned operation is sometimes called a clamper. This restores the waveform to its proper shape, despite the amplifier having only a one-polarity supply. This is directly related to the second phenomenon: the waveform on the center frequency becomes less distorted. The residual distortion is dependent upon the bandwidth of the tuned load, with the center frequency seeing very little distortion, but greater attenuation the farther from the tuned frequency that the signal gets.

The tuned circuit resonates at one frequency, the fixed carrier frequency, and so the unwanted frequencies are suppressed, and the wanted full signal (sine wave) is extracted by the tuned load. The signal bandwidth of the amplifier is limited by the Q-factor of the tuned circuit but this is not a serious limitation. Any residual harmonics can be removed using a further filter.

In practical class-C amplifiers a tuned load is invariably used. In one common arrangement the resistor shown in the circuit above is replaced with a parallel-tuned circuit consisting of an inductor and capacitor in parallel, whose components are chosen to resonate at the frequency of the input signal. Power can be coupled to a load by transformer action with a secondary coil wound on the inductor. The average voltage at the collector is then equal to the supply voltage, and the signal voltage appearing across the tuned circuit varies from near zero to near twice the supply voltage during the RF cycle. The input circuit is biased so that the active element (e.g., transistor) conducts for only a fraction of the RF cycle, usually one-third (120 degrees) or less.

The active element conducts only while the collector voltage is passing through its minimum. By this means, power dissipation in the active device is minimised, and efficiency increased. Ideally, the active element would pass only an instantaneous current pulse while the voltage across it is zero: it then dissipates no power and 100% efficiency is achieved. However practical devices have a limit to the peak current they can pass, and the pulse must therefore be widened, to around 120 degrees, to obtain a reasonable amount of power, and the efficiency is then 60–70%.

== Class D ==
Block diagram of a basic switching or PWM (class-D) amplifier.

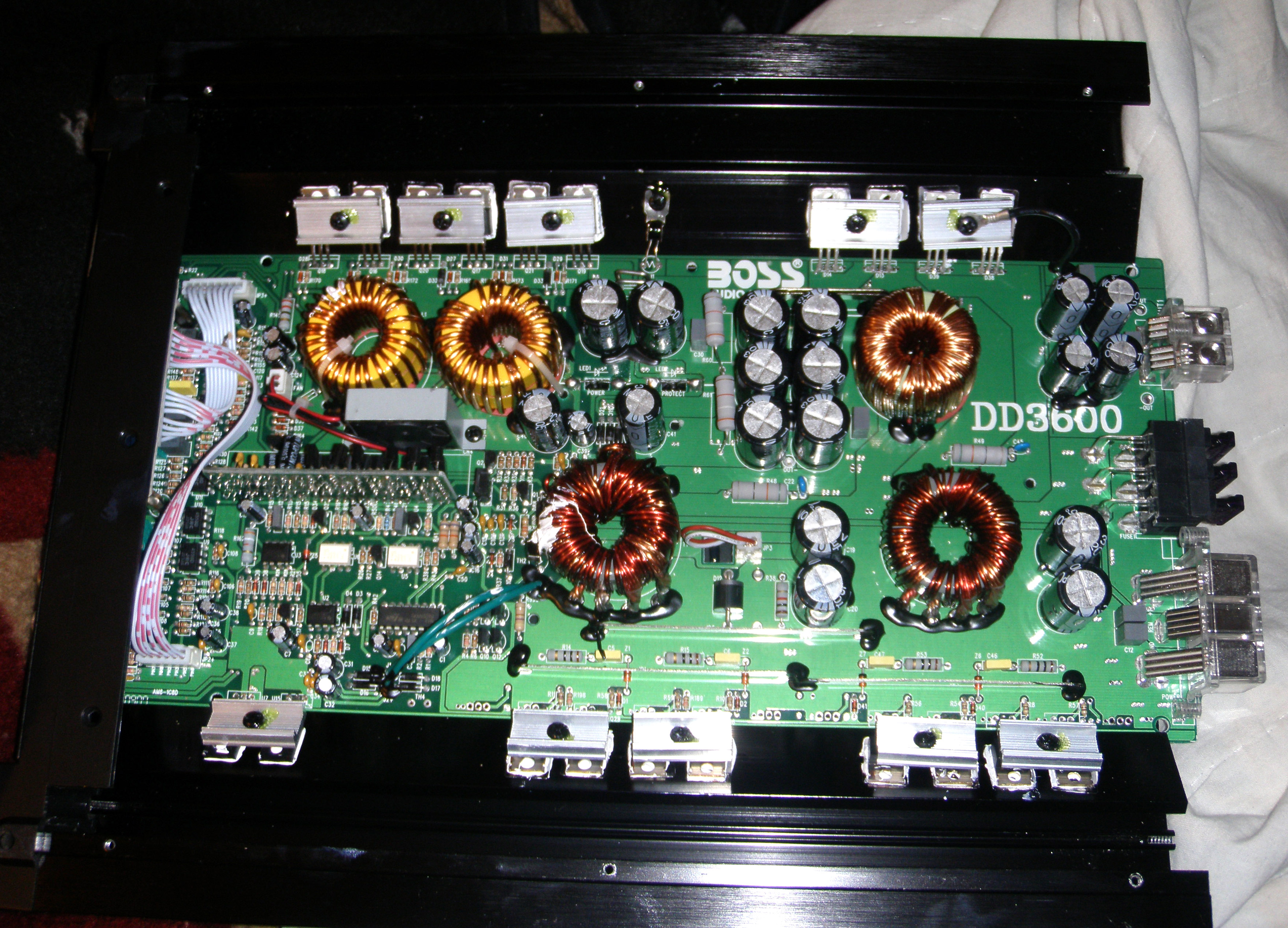
Boss Audio class-D mono amplifier with a low-pass filter for powering subwoofers

Class-D amplifiers use some form of pulse-width modulation to control the output devices. The conduction angle of each device is no longer related directly to the input signal but instead varies in pulse width.

In the class-D amplifier the active devices (transistors) function as electronic switches instead of linear gain devices; they are either on or off. The analog signal is converted to a stream of pulses that represents the signal by pulse-width modulation, pulse-density modulation, delta-sigma modulation or a related modulation technique before being applied to the amplifier. The time average power value of the pulses is directly proportional to the analog signal, so after amplification the signal can be converted back to an analog signal by a passive low-pass filter. The purpose of the output filter is to smooth the pulse stream to an analog signal, removing the high-frequency spectral components of the pulses. The frequency of the output pulses is typically ten or more times the highest frequency in the input signal to amplify, so that the filter can adequately reduce the unwanted harmonics and accurately reproduce the input.

The main advantage of a class-D amplifier is power efficiency. Efficiency over 90% is achievable with MOSFETs and >80% is fairly common. Because the output pulses have a fixed amplitude, the switching elements (usually MOSFETs, but vacuum tubes and bipolar transistors have also been used) are switched completely on or completely off, rather than operating in linear mode. A MOSFET generally operates with the lowest on-state resistance when fully on and thus (excluding when fully off) has the lowest power dissipation when in that condition. Compared to an equivalent class-AB device, a class-D amplifier's lower losses permit the use of smaller heat sinks for the MOSFETs while also reducing the amount of input power required, allowing for a lower-capacity power supply design. Therefore, class-D amplifiers are typically smaller than an equivalent class-AB amplifier.

Another advantage of the class-D amplifier is that it can operate from a digital signal source without requiring a digital-to-analog converter (DAC) to convert the signal to analog form first. If the signal source is in digital form, such as in a digital media player or computer sound card, the digital circuitry can convert the binary digital signal directly to a pulse-width modulation signal that is applied to the amplifier, simplifying the circuitry considerably and reducing opportunities for noise ingress.

A class-D amplifier with moderate output power can be constructed using regular CMOS logic process, making it suitable for integration with other types of digital circuitry. Thus it is commonly found in System-on-Chips with integrated audio when the amplifier shares a die with the main processor or DSP.

While class-D amplifiers are widely used to control motors, they are also used as power amplifiers. Though if the signal is not already in a pulse modulated format prior to amplification, it must first be converted, which may require additional circuitry. Switching power supplies have even been modified into crude class-D amplifiers (though typically these only reproduce low-frequencies with acceptable accuracy).

An early use of class-D amplifiers was high-power subwoofer amplifiers in cars. Because subwoofers are generally limited to a bandwidth of no higher than 150 Hz, switching speed for the amplifier does not have to be as high as for a full range amplifier, allowing simpler designs. Class-D amplifiers for driving subwoofers are relatively inexpensive in comparison to class-AB amplifiers.

The letter D used to designate this amplifier class is simply the next letter after C and, although occasionally used as such, does not stand for digital. Class-D and class-E amplifiers are sometimes mistakenly described as "digital" because the output waveform superficially resembles a pulse-train of digital symbols, but a class-D amplifier merely converts an input waveform into a continuously pulse-width modulated analog signal. (A digital waveform would be pulse-code modulated.)

== Class H ==
Class-H amplifiers are marked by variation of the supply rails (in discrete steps or in a continuous fashion, respectively) following the input signal. Wasted heat on the output devices can be reduced as excess voltage is kept to a minimum. The amplifier that is fed with these rails itself can be of any class. These kinds of amplifiers are more complex, and are mainly used for specialized applications, such as very high-power units. Also, amplifiers are commonly described in literature for touring audio applications where efficiency is 86% approximately of the traditional classes.

=== Other Classes ===
Other amplifier classes are mainly variations of the previous classes. For example, class-E amplifier is a highly efficient tuned switching power amplifier used at radio frequencies. It uses a single-pole switching element and a tuned reactive network between the switch and the load. The circuit obtains high efficiency by only operating the switching element at points of zero current (on to off switching) or zero voltage (off to on switching) which minimizes power lost in the switch, even when the switching time of the devices is long compared to the frequency of operation.

The class-E amplifier is frequently cited to have been first reported in 1975 by Alan and Nathan Sokal. However, a full description of class-E operation may be found in the 1964 doctoral thesis of Gerald D. Ewing. Interestingly, analytical design equations only recently became known.

=== Class F ===
In push–pull amplifiers and in CMOS, the even harmonics of both transistors just cancel. Experiment shows that a square wave can be generated by those amplifiers. Theoretically square waves consist of odd harmonics only. In a class-D amplifier, the output filter blocks all harmonics; i.e., the harmonics see an open load. So even small currents in the harmonics suffice to generate a voltage square wave. The current is in phase with the voltage applied to the filter, but the voltage across the transistors is out of phase. Therefore, there is a minimal overlap between current through the transistors and voltage across the transistors. The sharper the edges, the lower the overlap.

While in class-D, transistors and the load exist as two separate modules, class-F admits imperfections like the parasitics of the transistor and tries to optimise the global system to have a high impedance at the harmonics. Of course there must be a finite voltage across the transistor to push the current across the on-state resistance. Because the combined current through both transistors is mostly in the first harmonic, it looks like a sine. That means that in the middle of the square the maximum of current has to flow, so it may make sense to have a dip in the square or in other words to allow some overswing of the voltage square wave. A class-F load network by definition has to transmit below a cutoff frequency and reflect above.

Any frequency lying below the cutoff and having its second harmonic above the cutoff can be amplified, that is an octave bandwidth. On the other hand, an inductive-capacitive series circuit with a large inductance and a tunable capacitance may be simpler to implement. By reducing the duty cycle below 0.5, the output amplitude can be modulated. The voltage square waveform degrades, but any overheating is compensated by the lower overall power flowing. Any load mismatch behind the filter can only act on the first harmonic current waveform, clearly only a purely resistive load makes sense, then the lower the resistance, the higher the current.

Class-F can be driven by sine or by a square wave, for a sine the input can be tuned by an inductor to increase gain. If class-F is implemented with a single transistor, the filter is complicated to short the even harmonics. All previous designs use sharp edges to minimise the overlap.

=== Classes G and H ===
Idealized class-G rail voltage modulation

Idealized class-H rail voltage modulation

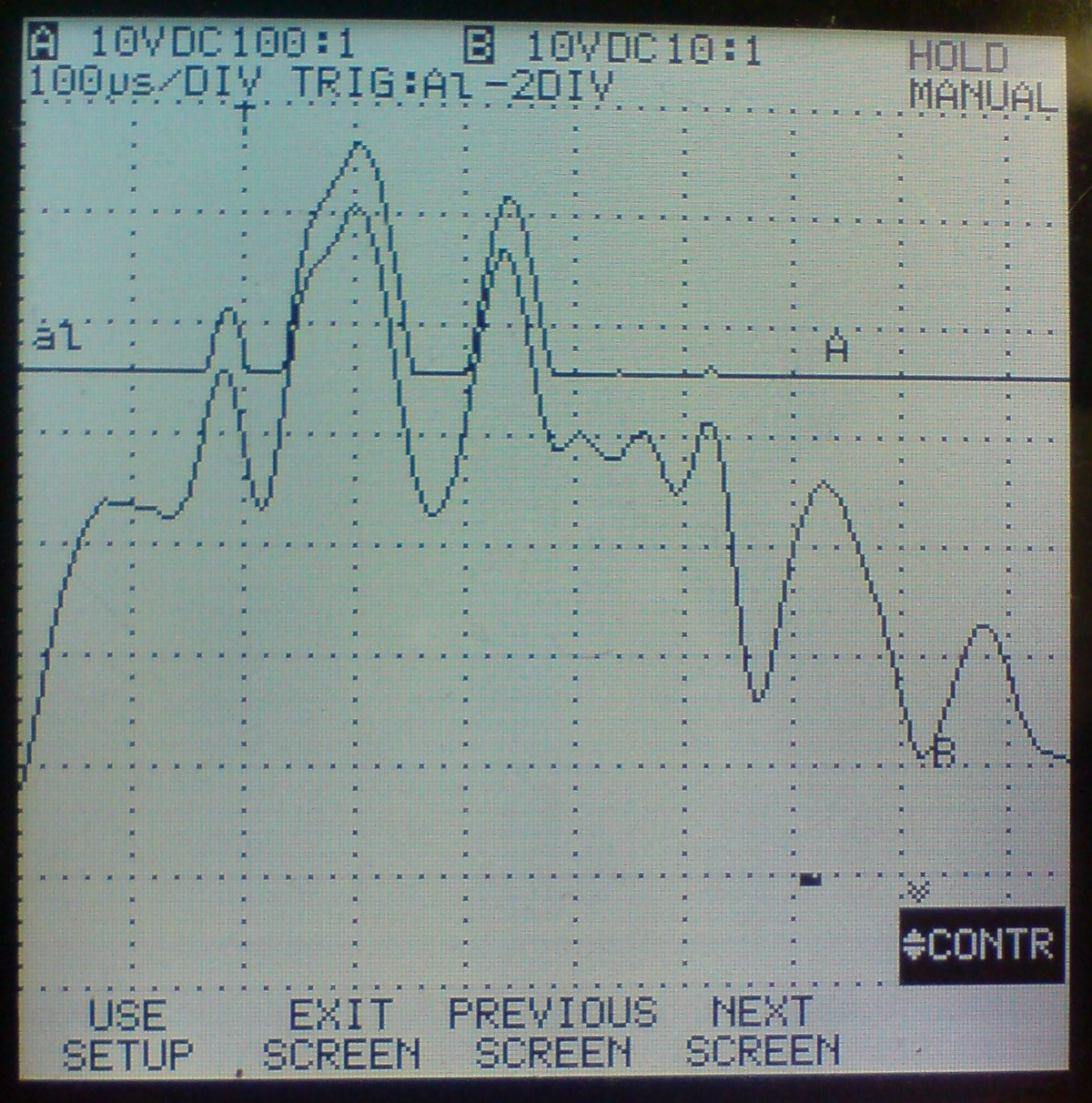
Rail voltage modulation

Basic schematic of a class-H configuration

There are a variety of amplifier designs that enhance class-AB output stages with more efficient techniques to achieve greater efficiency with low distortion. These designs are common in large audio amplifiers since the heatsinks and power transformers would be prohibitively large (and costly) without the efficiency increases. The terms "class-G" and "class-H" are used interchangeably to refer to different designs, varying in definition from one manufacturer or paper to another.

Class-G amplifiers (which use "rail switching" to decrease power consumption and increase efficiency) are more efficient than class-AB amplifiers. These amplifiers provide several power rails at different voltages and switch between them as the signal output approaches each level. Thus, the amplifier increases efficiency by reducing the wasted power at the output transistors. Class-G amplifiers are more efficient than class AB but less efficient when compared to class-D. However, they do not have the electromagnetic interference effects of class D.

Class-H amplifiers create an infinitely variable (analog) supply rail. They are sometimes referred to as rail trackers. This is done by modulating the supply rails so that the rails are only a few volts larger than the output signal "tracking" it at any given time. The output stage operates at its maximum efficiency all the time. This is due to the circuit ability to keep the rail transistors (T2 and T4) in cutoff until a music voltage peak is of a sufficient magnitude to require the additional voltage from the + and - 80 V supplies. Refer to the schematic figure. The class H amplifier can actually be thought of as two amplifiers in series. In the schematic example shown by the figure, +/- 40 V rail amplifiers can produce about 100 watts continuous into an 8-ohm load. If the output signal is operating below 40 volts, the amplifier only has the losses associated with a 100 W amplifier. This is because the class-H upper devices T2 and T4 are only used when the music signal is between 100 and 400 watts output. The key to understanding this efficiency without churning the actual numbers is that we have a 400-watt-capable amplifier but with the efficiency of a 100-watt amplifier. This is because the waveforms of music contain long periods under 100 watts and contain only brief bursts of up to 400 watts – in other words, the losses at 400 watts are for brief time periods. If this example were drawn as a class AB with just the 80 V supplies in place of the 40 V supplies, the T1 and T3 transistors would need to be in conduction throughout the 0 V to 80 V signal with the corresponding losses all through the wave period - not just the brief high energy bursts. To achieve this rail tracking control, T2 and T4 act as current amplifiers, each in series with its low voltage counterpart T1 and T3. The purpose of T2 and T3 is to allow back-biasing diode D2 when the amplifier output is at a positive peak (above 39.3 V) and back biasing D4 when the output is at negative peak less than -39.3 V. During the musical peaks from 100 to 400 watts, the +/-40 V rails source no current as all the current comes from the +/-80 V rails. This figure is too simplistic, however, as it will not actually control the T2 and T4 transistors at all. This is because the D1 and D3 diodes which are intended to provide a path for the output voltage back into the upper devices are always reverse biased. They are drawn backwards. In place of these diodes, a voltage amplifier with gain which uses vout as its input would be needed in an actual design. There is another reason for this gain requirement between vout and T2 base in an actual class-H design and that is to assure that the signal applied to the T2 is always "ahead" of the Vout signal so it can never "catch up" with the rail tracker. The rail tracker amplifier might have a 50 V/μs slew rate while the class-AB amplifier might have only a 30 V/μs slew rate in order to guarantee this.

== See also ==
- Class-T amplifier
- Class-XD Amplifier
