= Raimo Hämäläinen =

Finnish mathematician

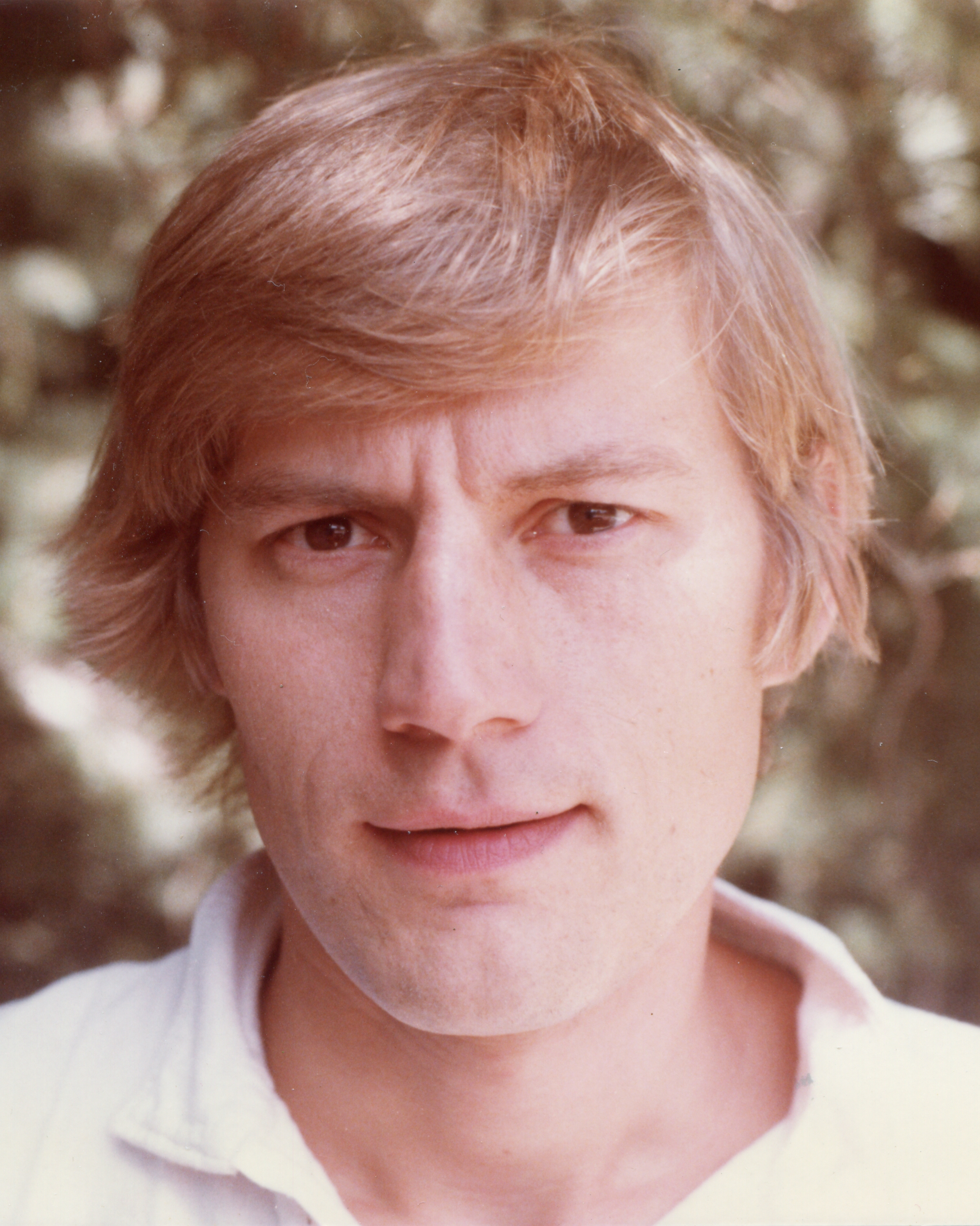
Hämäläinen in 1980

Raimo P. Hämäläinen (born 7 July 1948 in Helsinki, Finland) is a professor emeritus at the Aalto University School of Science (Aalto SCI), Finland. Hämäläinen founded Systems Analysis laboratory at Aalto SCI in 1984. His research interests include systems intelligence, multiple-criteria decision analysis, sequential games, simulation, and energy modeling.

Hämäläinen received his Doctor of Technology degree in 1977 from Helsinki University of Technology, advised by Aarne Halme and Olli Lokki.

In 2004, The International Society for Multiple Criteria Decision Making awarded Professor Hämäläinen for his work on MCDM research.

Hämäläinen retired on 1 August 2016.
