= Negative affectivity =

Personal tendency towards negative emotions and poor self-concept

In psychology, negative affectivity (NA), or negative affect, is a personality variable that involves the experience of negative emotions and poor self-concept. Negative affectivity subsumes a variety of negative emotions, including anger, contempt, disgust, guilt, fear, and nervousness. Low negative affectivity is characterized by frequent states of calmness and serenity, along with states of confidence, activeness, and great enthusiasm.

Individuals differ in negative emotional reactivity. Trait negative affectivity roughly corresponds to the dominant personality factor of anxiety/neuroticism that is found within the Big Five personality traits as emotional stability. The Big Five are characterized as openness, conscientiousness, extraversion, agreeableness, and neuroticism. Neuroticism can plague an individual with severe mood swings, frequent sadness, worry, and being easily disturbed, and predicts the development and onset of all "common" mental disorders. Research shows that negative affectivity relates to different classes of variables: Self-reported stress and (poor) coping skills, health complaints, and frequency of unpleasant events. Weight gain and mental health complaints are often experienced as well.

People who express high negative affectivity view themselves and a variety of aspects of the world around them in generally negative terms. Negative affectivity is strongly related to life satisfaction. Individuals high in negative affect will exhibit, on average, higher levels of distress, anxiety, and dissatisfaction, and tend to focus on the unpleasant aspects of themselves, the world, the future, and other people, and also evoke more negative life events. The similarities between these affective traits and life satisfaction have led some researchers to view both positive and negative affect with life satisfaction as specific indicators of the broader construct of subjective well-being.

Negative affect arousal mechanisms can induce negative affective states as evidenced by a study conducted by Stanley S. Seidner on negative arousal and white noise. The study quantified reactions from Mexican and Puerto Rican participants in response to the devaluation of speakers from other ethnic origins.

== Measurement ==
There are many instruments that can be used to measure negative affectivity, including measures of related concepts, such as neuroticism and trait anxiety. Two frequently used are:

PANAS – The Positive and Negative Affect Schedule incorporates a 10-item negative affect scale. The PANAS-X is an expanded version of PANAS that incorporates negative affect subscales for Fear, Sadness, Guilt, Hostility, and Shyness.

I-PANAS-SF – The International Positive and Negative Affect Schedule Short Form is an extensively validated brief, cross-culturally reliable 10-item version of the PANAS. Negative Affect items are Afraid, Ashamed, Hostile, Nervous and Upset. Internal consistency reliabilities between .72 and .76 are reported. The I-PANAS-SF was developed to eliminate redundant and ambiguous items and thereby derive an efficient measure for general use in research situations where either time or space are limited, or where international populations are of interest but where English may not be the mother tongue.

== Benefits ==
Studies have indicated that negative affect has important, beneficial impacts on cognition and behavior. These developments were a departure from earlier psychological research, which was characterized by a unilateral emphasis on the benefits of positive affect. Both states of affect influence mental processes and behavior.

Benefits of negative affect are present in areas of cognition including perception, judgement, memory and interpersonal personal relations. Since negative affect relies more on cautious processing than preexisting knowledge, people with negative affect tend to perform better in instances involving deception, manipulation, impression formation, and stereotyping. Negative affectivity's analytical and detailed processing of information leads to fewer reconstructive-memory errors, whereas positive mood relies on broader schematic to thematic information that ignores detail. Thus, information processing in negative moods reduces the misinformation effect and increases overall accuracy of details. People also exhibit less interfering responses to stimuli when given descriptions or performing any cognitive task.

=== Judgment ===
People are notoriously susceptible to forming inaccurate judgments based on biases and limited information. Evolutionary theories propose that negative affective states tend to increase skepticism and decrease reliance on preexisting knowledge. Consequently, judgmental accuracy is improved in areas such as impression formation, reducing fundamental attribution error, stereotyping, and gullibility. While sadness is normally associated with the hippocampus, it does not produce the same side effects that would be associated with feelings of pleasure or excitement. Sadness correlates with feeling blue or the creation of tears, while excitement may cause a spike in blood pressure and one's pulse. As far as judgment goes, most people think about how they themselves feel about a certain situation. They will jump right to their current mood when asked a question. However, some mistake this process when using their current mood to justify a reaction to a stimulus. If they are only a little sad, their reactions and input may be negative as a whole.

==== Impression formation ====
First impressions are one of the most basic forms of judgments people make on a daily basis; yet judgment formation is a complex and fallible process. Negative affect is shown to decrease errors in forming impressions based on presuppositions. One common judgment error is the halo effect, or the tendency to form unfounded impressions of people based on known but irrelevant information. For instance, more attractive people are often attributed with more positive qualities. Research demonstrates that positive affect tends to increase the halo effect, whereas negative affect decreases it.

A study involving undergraduate students demonstrated a halo effect in identifying a middle-aged man as more likely to be a philosopher than an unconventional, young woman. These halo effects were nearly eliminated when participants were in a negative affective state. In the study, researchers sorted participants into either happy or sad groups using an autobiographical mood induction task in which participants reminisced on sad or happy memories. Then, participants read a philosophical essay by a fake academic who was identified as either a middle-aged, bespectacled man or as a young, unorthodox-looking woman. The fake writer was evaluated on intelligence and competence. The positive affect group exhibited a strong halo effect, rating the male writer significantly higher than the female writer in competence. The negative affect group exhibited almost no halo effects rating the two equally. Researchers concluded that impression formation is improved by negative affect. Their findings support theories that negative affect results in more elaborate processing based upon external, available information.

==== Fundamental attribution error ====
The systematic, attentive approach caused by negative affect reduces fundamental attribution error, the tendency to inaccurately attribute behavior to a person's internal character without taking external, situational factors into account. The fundamental attribution error (FAE) is connected with positive affect since it occurs when people use top-down cognitive processing based on inferences. Negative affect stimulates bottom-up, systematic analysis that reduces fundamental attribution error.

This effect is documented in FAE research in which students evaluated a fake debater on attitude and likability based on an essay the "debater" wrote. After being sorted into positive or negative affect groups, participants read one of two possible essays arguing for one side or another on a highly controversial topic. Participants were informed that the debater was assigned a stance to take in the essay that did not necessarily reflect his views. Still, the positive affect groups rated debaters who argued unpopular views as holding the same attitude expressed in the essay. They were also rated as unlikeable compared to debaters with popular stances, thus, demonstrating FAE. In contrast, the data for the negative affect group displayed no significant difference in ratings for debaters with popular stance and debaters with unpopular stances. These results indicate that positive affect assimilation styles promote fundamental attribution error, and negative affect accommodation styles minimize the error in respect to judging people.

==== Stereotyping ====
Negative affect benefits judgment in diminishing the implicit use of stereotypes by promoting closer attention to stimuli. In one study, participants were less likely to discriminate against targets that appeared Muslim when in a negative affective state. After organizing participants into positive and negative affect groups, researchers had them play a computer game. Participants had to make rapid decisions to shoot only at targets carrying a gun. Some of the targets wore turbans making them appear Muslim. As expected, there was a significant bias against Muslim targets resulting in a tendency to shoot at them. However, this tendency decreased with subjects in negative affective states. Positive affect groups developed more aggressive tendencies toward Muslims. Researchers concluded that negative affect leads to less reliance on internal stereotypes, thus decreasing judgmental bias.

==== Gullibility ====
Multiple studies have shown that negative affectivity has a beneficial role in increasing skepticism and decreasing gullibility. Because negative affective states increase external analysis and attention to details, people in negative states are better able to detect deception.

Researchers have presented findings in which students in negative affective states had improved lie detection compared to students in positive affective states. In a study, students watched video clips of everyday people either lying or telling the truth. First, music was used to induce positive, negative, or neutral affect in participants. Then, experimenters played 14 video messages that had to be identified by participants as true or false. As expected, the negative affect group performed better in veracity judgments than the positive affect group who performed no better than chance. Researchers believe that the negative affect groups detected deception more successfully because they attended to stimulus details and systematically built inferences from those details.

=== Memory ===
Memory has been found to have many failures that affect the accuracy of recalled memories. This has been especially pragmatic in criminal settings as eyewitness memories have been found to be less reliable than one would hope. However, the externally focused and accommodative processing of negative affect has a positive effect on the overall improvement of memory. This is evidenced by reduction of the misinformation effect, and the number of false memories reported. The knowledge implies that negative affect can be used to enhance eyewitness memory; however, additional research suggests that the extent to which memory is improved by negative affect does not sufficiently improve eyewitness testimonies to significantly reduce its error.

==== Misinformation effect ====
Negative affect has been shown to decrease susceptibility of incorporating misleading information, which is related to the misinformation effect. The misinformation effect refers to the finding that misleading information presented between the encoding of an event and its subsequent recall influences a witness's memory. This corresponds to two types of memory failure:

Suggestibility: When recollections are influenced by the prodding or expectations of others creating false memories.
Misattribution: When a witness gets confused and misattributes the misinformation to the original event. Also defined as the retroactive interference: When later information interferes with the ability to retain previously encoded information.

===== In witness of events =====
Negative mood is shown to decrease suggestibility error. This is seen through reduced amounts of incorporation of false memories when misleading information is present. On the other hand, positive affect has shown to increase susceptibility to misleading information. An experiment with undergraduate students supported these results. Participants began the study in a lecture hall and witnessed what they thought was an unexpected five-minute belligerent encounter between an intruder and the lecturer. A week later, these participants watched a 10-minute-long video that generated either a positive, negative or neutral mood. They then completed a brief questionnaire about the previous incident between the intruder and lecturer that they witnessed the week earlier. In this questionnaire half of the participants received questions with misleading information and the other half received questions without any misleading information. This manipulation was used to determine if participants were susceptible to suggestibility failure. After 45 minutes of unrelated distractors participants were given a set of true or false questions which tested for false memories. Participants experiencing negative moods reported fewer numbers of false memories, whereas those experiencing positive moods reported a greater amount of false memories. This implies that positive affect promotes integration of misleading details and negative affect reduces the misinformation effect.

===== In recall of past public events =====
People who experience negative affectivity following an event report fewer reconstructive false memories. This was evidenced by two studies conducted around public events. The first surrounded the events of the televised O.J. Simpson trial. Participants were asked to fill out questionnaires three times: one week, two months and a year after the televised verdict. These questionnaires measured participant emotion towards the verdict and the accuracy of their recalled memory of what occurred during the trial. Overall the study found that although participant response to the event outcome did not affect the quantity of remembered information, it did influence the likelihood of false memory. Participants who were pleased with the verdict of the O.J. Simpson trial were more likely to falsely believe something occurred during the trial than those who were displeased with the verdict. Another experiment found the same findings with Red Sox fans and Yankees fans in their overall memory of events that occurred in the final game of a 2004 playoff series in which the Red Sox defeated the Yankees. The study found that the Yankees fans had better memory of events that occurred than the Red Sox fans. The results from both of these experiments are consistent with the findings that negative emotion can lead to fewer memory errors and thus increased memory accuracy of events.

==== Degree of enhanced memory ====
Although negative affect has been shown to decrease the misinformation effect, the degree to which memory is improved is not enough to make a significant effect on witness testimony. In fact, emotions, including negative affect, are shown to reduce accuracy in identifying perpetrators from photographic lineups. Researchers demonstrated this effect in an experiment in which participants watched a video that induced either negative emotion or a neutral mood. The two videos were deliberately similar except for the action of interest, which was either a mugging (negative emotion) or a conversation (neutral emotion). After watching one of the two videos participants are shown perpetrator lineups, which either contained the target perpetrator from the video or a foil, a person that looked similar to the target. The results revealed that the participants who watched the emotion-induced video were more likely to incorrectly identify the innocent foil than to correctly identify the perpetrator. Neutral participants were more likely to correctly identify the perpetrator in comparison to their emotional counterparts. This demonstrates that emotional affect in forensic settings decreases accuracy of eyewitness memory. These findings are consistent with prior knowledge that stress and emotion greatly impair eyewitness ability to recognitive perpetrators.

=== Interpersonal benefits ===
Negative affectivity can produce several interpersonal benefits. It can cause subjects to be more polite and considerate with others. Unlike positive mood, which causes less assertive approaches, negative affectivity can, in many ways, cause a person to be more polite and elaborate when making requests.

Negative affectivity increases the accuracy of social perceptions and inferences. Specifically, high negative-affectivity people have more negative, but accurate, perceptions of the impression they make to others. People with low negative affectivity form overly-positive, potentially inaccurate impression of others that can lead to misplaced trust.

==== Intergroup discrimination ====
A research conducted by Forgas J.P studied how affectivity can influence intergroup discrimination. He measured affectivity by how people allocate rewards to in-group and out-group members. In the procedure, participants had to describe their interpretations after looking at patterns of judgments about people. Afterwards, participants were exposed to a mood induction process, where they had to watch videotapes designed to elicit negative or positive affectivity. Results showed that participants with positive affectivity were more negative and discriminated more than participants with negative affectivity. Also, happy participants were more likely to discriminate between in-group and out-group members than sad participants. Negative affect is often associated with team selection. It is viewed as a trait that could make selecting individuals for a team irrelevant, thus preventing knowledge from becoming known or predicted for current issues that may arise.

==== Communication ====
Negative affectivity subconsciously signals a challenging social environment. Negative mood may increase a tendency to conform to social norms.

In a study, college students were exposed to a mood induction process. After the mood induction process, participants were required to watch a show with positive and negative elements. After watching the show, they were asked to engage on a hypothetical conversation in which they "describe the episode (they) just observed to a friend". Their speech was recorded and transcribed during this task. Results showed that speakers in a negative mood had a better quality descriptions and greater amount of information and details. These results show that negative mood can improve people's communication skills.

A negative mood is closely linked to better conversation because it makes use of the hippocampus and different regions of the brain. When someone is upset, that individual may see or hear things differently than an individual who is very upbeat and happy all the time. The small details the negative individual picks up may be something completely overlooked before. Anxiety disorders are often associated with over-thinking and ruminating on topics that would seem irrelevant and pointless to an individual without a disorder. OCD is one common anxiety trait that allows the affected individual a different insight on how things may appear to be. A person that makes use of his or her negative affect has a different view of the world and what goes on in it, thus making their conversations different and interesting to others.

==== Self-disclosure ====
Results of one study show that participants with negative affectivity were more careful with the information they shared with others, being more cautious with who they could trust or not. Researchers found that negative mood not only decreases intimacy levels but also increases caution in placing trust in others.

=== Enhanced ability to experience feelings ===
Negative affect is regularly recognized as a "stable, heritable trait tendency to experience a broad range of negative feelings, such as worry, anxiety, self-criticisms, and a negative self-view". This allows one to feel every type of emotion, which is regarded as a normal part of life and human nature. So, while the emotions themselves are viewed as negative, the individual experiencing them should not be classified as a negative person or depressed. They are going through a normal process and are feeling something that many individuals may not be able to feel or process due to differing problems.

=== Fit with evolutionary psychology ===
These findings complement evolutionary psychology theories that affective states serve adaptive functions in promoting suitable cognitive strategies to deal with environmental challenges. Positive affect is associated with assimilative, top-down processing used in response to familiar, benign environments. Negative affect is connected with accommodative, bottom-up processing in response to unfamiliar, or problematic environments. Thus, positive affectivity promotes simplistic heuristic approaches that rely on preexisting knowledge and assumptions. Conversely, negative affectivity promotes controlled, analytic approaches that rely on externally drawn information.

== See also ==
- Affect (psychology)
- Emotion
- Health psychology
- Negative affectivity in personality disorder or personality difficulty
- Personality psychology
- Positive affectivity
- Toxic positivity
