= Criticism of postmodernism =

Criticism of postmodernism encompasses critical attitudes toward postmodernity, postmodern philosophy, postmodern art, and postmodern architecture. Postmodernism is generally defined by an attitude of skepticism, irony, or rejection towards what it describes as the meta-narratives and ideologies associated with modernism, especially those associated with Enlightenment rationality. Common targets of postmodern criticism include universalist ideas of objective reality, morals (moral universalism), truth, reason, science, language, human nature, and social progress, which in turn are defended by postmodernism's critics.

Critiques of postmodernism frequently allege that its scholars promote obscurantism, are hostile to objective truth, and encourage relativism in culture, morality, and knowledge to an extent that is epistemically and ethically crippling. Criticism of more artistic postmodern movements in the arts have included objections to a departure from beauty, lack of coherence or comprehensibility, deviating from clear structure and a consistent use of dark and negative themes.

== Vagueness ==
Postmodernism has received significant academic criticism for its lack of stable definition and meaning. The term marks a departure from modernism, and may refer to "postmodernity" as an epoch of human history, a set of movements, styles, and methods in art and architecture, or a broad range of scholarship, drawing influence from scholarly fields such as critical theory, post-structuralist philosophy, and deconstructionism. The Stanford Encyclopedia of Philosophy states that "the indefinability of postmodernism is a truism."

Some writers, including media theorist Dick Hebdige, have suggested that the term is a meaningless buzzword, while others including the historian Perry Anderson defend its varied meanings assigned to "postmodernism", arguing in Anderson's case that they only contradict one another on the surface, and that a postmodernist analysis can offer insight into contemporary culture.

The perceived verbosity and obscurantism of postmodernism has been attacked as intellectual dishonesty by authors including Christopher Hitchens and Richard Dawkins.

== Relativism and epistemology ==
Philosophers such as Roger Scruton, Theodore Schick, William Lane Craig, Daniel Dennett, Jürgen Habermas, and the historian Richard J. Evans, have taken postmodernism to task for its relativist positions and argued that it is self-contradictory. Another line of criticism argues that postmodernism has failed to provide a viable method for determining what can be considered knowledge, or that it is a dead end in social work epistemology.

Linguist Noam Chomsky has argued that postmodernism is meaningless because it adds nothing to analytical or empirical knowledge. He asks why postmodernist intellectuals won't respond like people in other fields when asked:

Seriously, what are the principles of their theories, on what evidence are they based, what do they explain that wasn't already obvious, etc? These are fair requests for anyone to make. If they can't be met, then I'd suggest recourse to Hume's advice in similar circumstances: to the flames.

Richard Caputo, William Epstein, David Stoesz & Bruce Thyer consider postmodernism to be a "dead-end in social work epistemology." They write:

Postmodernism continues to have a detrimental influence on social work, questioning the Enlightenment, criticizing established research methods, and challenging scientific authority. The promotion of postmodernism by editors of Social Work and the Journal of Social Work Education has elevated postmodernism, placing it on a par with theoretically guided and empirically based research. The inclusion of postmodernism in the 2008 Educational Policy and Accreditation Standards of the Council on Social Work Education and its 2015 sequel further erode the knowledge-building capacity of social work educators. In relation to other disciplines that have exploited empirical methods, social work's stature will continue to ebb until postmodernism is rejected in favor of scientific methods for generating knowledge.

Analytic philosopher Daniel Dennett said, "Postmodernism, the school of 'thought' that proclaimed 'There are no truths, only interpretations' has largely played itself out in absurdity, but it has left behind a generation of academics in the humanities disabled by their distrust of the very idea of truth and their disrespect for evidence, settling for 'conversations' in which nobody is wrong and nothing can be confirmed, only asserted with whatever style you can muster."

== Political perspectives ==
Some Marxist writers have expressed skepticism over postmodernism, with the art historian John Molyneux and political theorist Alex Callinicos, both members of the Socialist Workers' Party in the UK, denouncing it as bourgeois and a reflection of generational frustration at the failure of May 68 to achieve revolution in France; or, in the case of the American literary critic and Marxist political theorist Fredric Jameson, describing it as refusing to critically engage with the issues of capitalization and globalization, and being complicit with the prevailing relations of domination and exploitation.

The American Libertarian historian Michael Rectenwald argues that postmodernism denies self-determination by seeing individuals as the product of social factors, while the American historian Richard Wolin considers it to have intellectual roots in writers who had a fascination with fascism.

== Sokal affair ==
In 1996 Alan Sokal, a physics professor at New York University, perpetrated a hoax in which he wrote a deliberately nonsensical academic article in a style similar to postmodernist articles, which liberally used vague post-modernist concepts and lingo while criticising empirical approaches to knowledge. Despite its being an obvious parody of postmodernist writing, the article was accepted for publication by the journal Social Text. On the same day that it was published he published another article in a different journal which explained the hoax. He subsequently expanded the explanation into the book Fashionable Nonsense, coauthored with the philosopher of science Jean Bricmont, which offered a critique of the practices of postmodern academia.

== See also ==
- Postmodernism Generator
- Thinkers of the New Left
