= James Garvey =

James Garvey may refer to:

- James Garvey (footballer) (1880–?), English footballer
- James Garvey (philosopher), American philosopher
- James Garvey (politician) (born 1964), politician in Louisiana
- James Garvey (hurler) (1899–1987), Irish hurler
