= Mara Beller =

Jewish historian and philosopher of science (1945-2004)

- מרה בלר
- Born: Mara Baruch; 14 August 1945
- Died: 30 October 2004 (aged 59)
- Occupations: Historian and philosopher of science

Academic background
- Education: University of Maryland
- Thesis: The genesis of interpretations of quantum physics, 1925-1927 (1983)

Mara Beller (Hebrew: מרה בלר; born Mara Baruch; August 14, 1945 – October 30, 2004) was an Israeli historian and philosopher of science.

== Early life and education ==
Beller was born in the Soviet Union and migrated to Israel at age 19. She obtained her M.Sc. degree in the history and philosophy of science at the Hebrew University of Jerusalem in 1976. In 1983 she received her doctorate in history from the University of Maryland with a dissertation titled "The Genesis and Interpretation of Quantum Physics, 1925-1927".

== Career ==
Beller was the Barbara Druss Dibner Professor of History and Philosophy of Science at the Hebrew University of Jerusalem, Israel.

=== Work ===
Beller is mainly known for her book Quantum Dialogue: The Making of a Revolution and her intervention in the Sokal affair.

In Quantum Dialogue she draws out the early historical development of quantum mechanics, which she describes as moving from a state of "concepts in flux" into one in which "this dialogical flux is flattened into a monological narrative". Beller puts the theory's historical development into a critical perspective, drawing upon works by philosophers of science Thomas Kuhn and Imre Lakatos. She describes how in the early years of quantum mechanics some physicists, particularly Niels Bohr, systematically shut down what the historian of science Olival Freire Jr. later termed "the controversy on the foundations and interpretation of quantum mechanics." The book received the Morris D. Forkosch Prize for the best book in intellectual history published in 1999.

Beller took a public position in the science wars with her short paper "The Sokal Hoax: At Whom Are We Laughing?". The paper was a response to the Sokal affair and received widespread attention: in a letter to Physics Today on April 7, 1999, Jean Bricmont and Alan Sokal responded to it as well as to an article by David Mermin. The magazine published their letter along with responses by Mermin and Beller. In her response, Beller argues for teaching alternatives to the Copenhagen interpretation in quantum mechanics courses, concluding with the following words:

We need not "try to convince" each other. There is no need for us to agree. We will be amply rewarded if each of us emerges from the encounter with a little more insight and understanding than before.

In her later years, Beller wrote a play that features a fictitious love affair between the poet Marina Tsvetaeva and the physicist Albert Einstein. It was staged at the Hebrew University of Jerusalem in 2005, a few months after Beller's death.

=== Honors ===
Beller received the 1986 Zeitlin - Ver Brugge Prize for her article "Matrix Theory before Schrödinger".

== Selected publications ==
- Beller, Mara. The Genesis of Interpretations of Quantum Physics: 1925-1927. Ann Arbor, MI: University Microfilms, 1998.
- Beller, Mara. Quantum Dialogue: The Making of a Revolution. Chicago: University of Chicago Press, 1999.
- Beller, Mara. Einstein in Context: A Special Issue of Science in Context. Cambridge: Cambridge University Press, 1993.
- Beller, Mara. "The Sokal Hoax: At Whom Are We Laughing?" Physics Today 51, Nr. 9 (1998): 29. https://doi.org/10.1063/1.882436
- Beller, Mara. "Born's probabilistic interpretation: A case study of 'concepts in flux'". Studies in History and Philosophy of Science Part A 21, Nr. 4 (January, 1990): 563–88. https://doi.org/10.1016/0039-3681(90)90033-5
- Beller, Mara. "The Word with a Loophole and the Word with a Sideward Glance: Dialogical Approach in Science and Literature." Partial Answers: Journal of Literature and the History of Ideas 1, no. 2 (2003): 27–43. https://doi.org/10.1353/pan.0.0029
- Beller, Mara. "Jocular Commemorations: The Copenhagen Spirit." Osiris 14, no. 1 (January 1999): 252–73. https://doi.org/10.1086/649310
- Beller, Mara. "The Birth of Bohr's Complementarity: The Context and the Dialogues." Studies in History and Philosophy of Science Part A 23, no. 1 (March 1, 1992): 147–80. https://doi.org/10.1016/0039-3681(92)90029-6
- Beller, Mara. "The Conceptual and the Anecdotal History of Quantum Mechanics." Foundations of Physics 26, no. 4 (April 1996): 545–57. https://doi.org/10.1007/BF02071220

== See also ==
- James T. Cushing
- Max Jammer
- The Structure of Scientific Revolutions
- Demarcation problem
