= Saqqara Bird =

Ancient Egyptian wooden bird

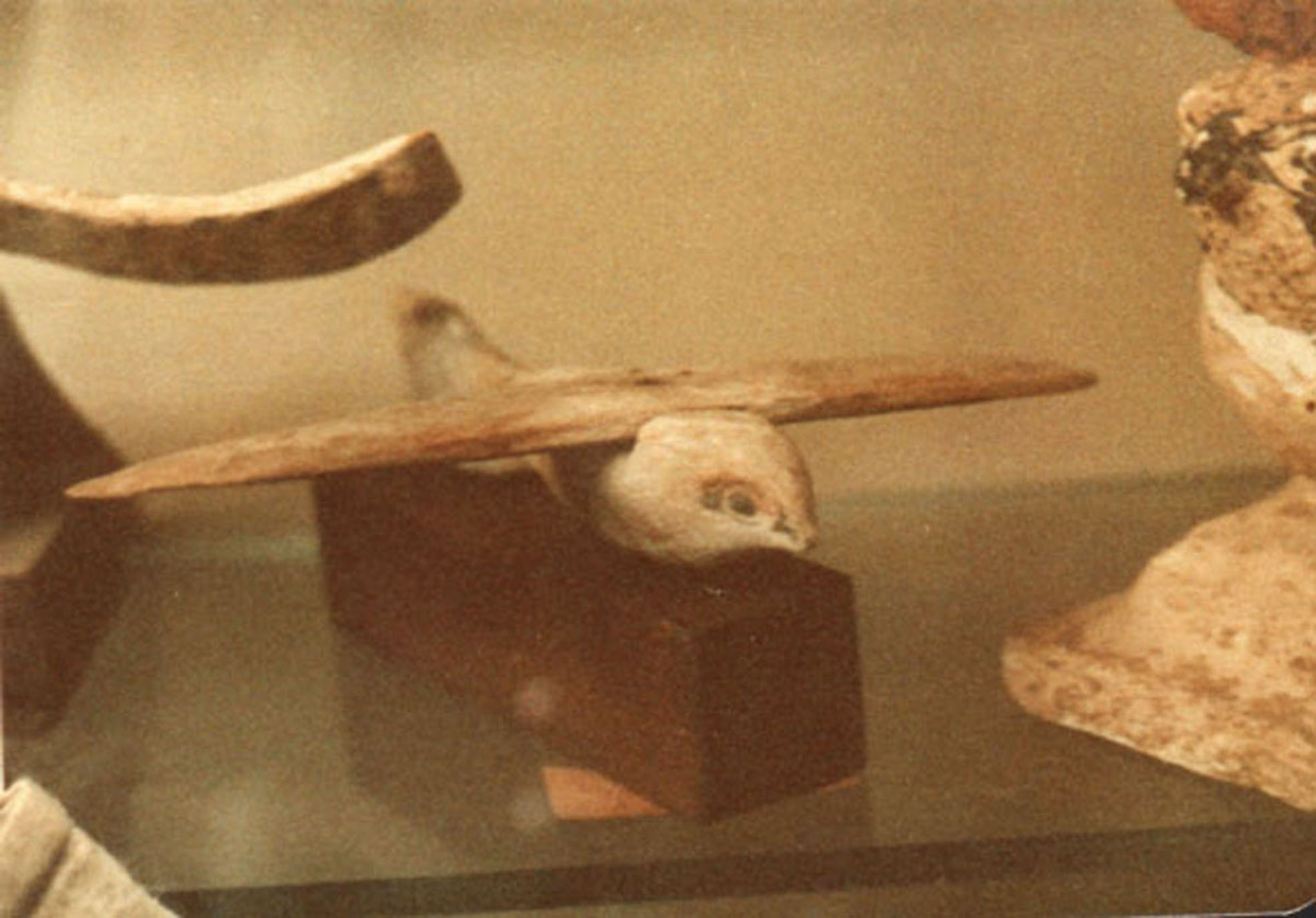
- Material: Wood
- Width: 18 cm
- Created: c. 200 BC
- Discovered: 1898; Badrashin, Giza, Egypt
- Present location: Cairo, Cairo Governorate, Egypt

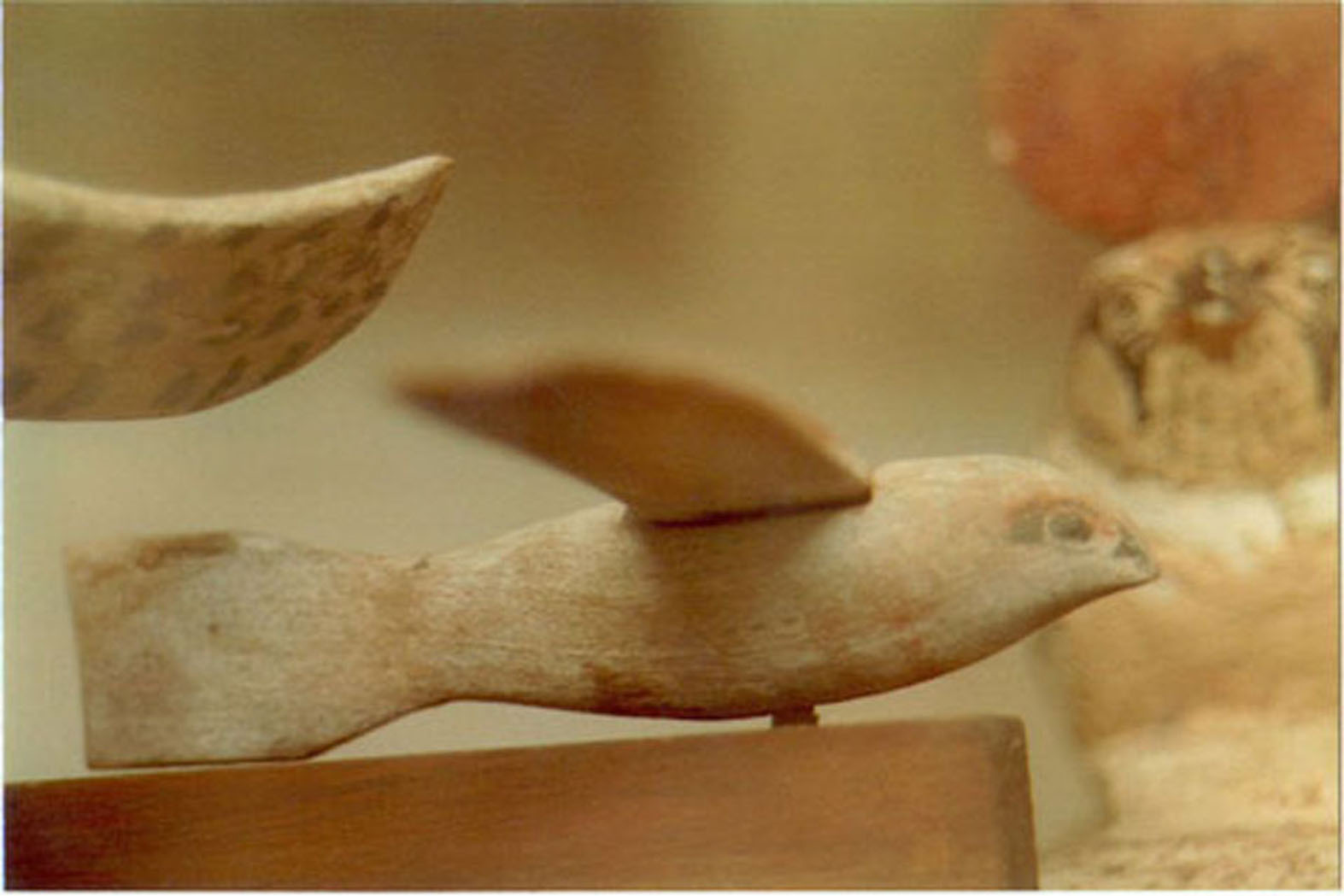
The bird from the side

The Saqqara Bird is a model bird made of sycamore wood and mounted on a stick, discovered during the 1898 excavation of the tomb of Pa-di-Imen in Saqqara, Egypt. It has been dated to approximately 200 BCE, and is now housed in the Egyptian Museum in Cairo. The Saqqara Bird has a wingspan of 18 cm (7.1 in) and weighs 39.12 g (1.380 oz). Its purpose is unknown, although it is not capable of flight.

== Suggested purposes ==
The Saqqara Bird may be a ceremonial object because the falcon, the bird after which the Saqqara Bird is modeled, is the form most commonly used to represent several of the most important gods of Egyptian mythology, most notably the falcon deity Horus and the sun deity Ra Horakhty. Other possibilities are that it may have been a toy for an elite child, or it could have functioned as a weather vane. Another hypothesis is that this bird was positioned on the masthead of sacred boats used during the Opet Festival. Reliefs showing those boats are found in the Temple of Khonsu at Karnak and date to the late New Kingdom.

== False claims of aerodynamics ==
Some have suggested that the Saqqara Bird may represent evidence that knowledge of aerodynamics existed many centuries before its principles are known to have been discovered. Egyptian physician and dowser Khalil Messiha has speculated that the ancient Egyptians developed the first aircraft.

According to Kevin Desmond writing about the history of airplanes, no evidence has been found suggesting that these claims are true. As a result, the theory that the Saqqara Bird is a model of a flying machine is rejected by mainstream science. Richard P. Hallion notes that it is "far too heavy and unstable itself to fly". Norman Levitt and Paul R. Gross comment "The evidence? If you build a copy of balsa wood (rather than the original sycamore), and then add a vertical stabilizer (not present in the original) to the tail, you get a so-so version of a toy glider!"

Researchers at the Institute of Aerospace Technology Bremen conducted a CFD simulation of the artifact based on a 3D scan in 2023. The results showed that the artifact has a low maximum glide ratio and thus the glide properties are not sufficient. The center of mass of the artifact is also located at the trailing edge of the wing and thereby behind the neutral point. It is therefore unstable in pitch. In addition, it has an asymmetric lift distribution across the span of the wing, and would roll uncontrollably. The results are not consistent with the suggestion that the Saqqara Bird demonstrates ancient knowledge of aerodynamics.

== See also ==
- Quimbaya artifacts, a few of which resemble airplanes
