= Sokal affair =

1996 scholarly publishing sting accepted by an academic journal

The Sokal affair, also known as the Sokal hoax, was a demonstrative scholarly hoax performed by Alan Sokal, a physics professor at New York University and University College London. In 1996, Sokal submitted an article to Social Text, an academic journal of cultural studies. The submission was an experiment to test the journal's intellectual rigor, specifically to investigate whether "a leading North American journal of cultural studies—whose editorial collective includes such luminaries as Fredric Jameson and Andrew Ross—[would] publish an article liberally salted with nonsense if (a) it sounded good and (b) it flattered the editors' ideological preconceptions."

The article, "Transgressing the Boundaries: Towards a Transformative Hermeneutics of Quantum Gravity", was published in the journal's Spring/Summer 1996 "Science Wars" issue. It proposed that quantum gravity is a social and linguistic construct. The journal did not practice academic peer review at the time, so it did not submit the article for outside expert review by a physicist. Three weeks after its publication in May 1996, Sokal revealed in the magazine Lingua Franca that the article was a hoax.

The hoax caused controversy about the scholarly merit of commentary on the physical sciences by those in the humanities; the influence of postmodern philosophy on social disciplines in general; and academic ethics, including whether Sokal was wrong to deceive the editors or readers of Social Text; and whether Social Text had abided by proper scientific ethics.

In 2008, Sokal published Beyond the Hoax, which revisited the history of the hoax and discussed its lasting implications.

== Background ==
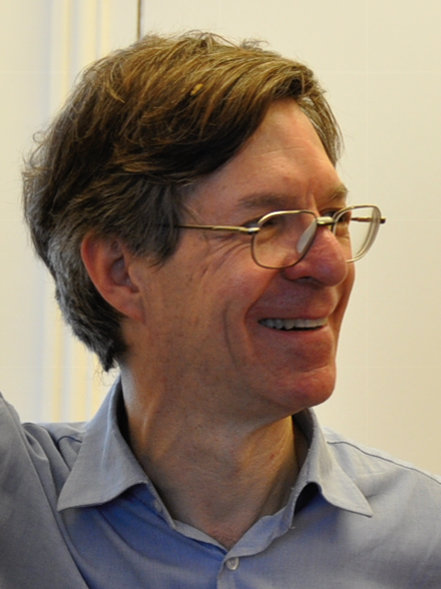
Sokal in 2011

In an interview on the U.S. radio program All Things Considered, Sokal said he was inspired to submit the bogus article after reading Higher Superstition (1994), in which authors Paul R. Gross and Norman Levitt claim that some humanities journals will publish anything as long as it has "the proper leftist thought" and quoted (or was written by) well-known leftist thinkers.

Gross and Levitt had been defenders of the philosophy of scientific realism, opposing postmodernist academics who questioned scientific objectivity. They asserted that anti-intellectual sentiment in liberal arts departments (especially English departments) caused the increase of deconstructionist thought, which eventually resulted in a deconstructionist critique of science. They saw the critique as a "repertoire of rationalizations" for avoiding the study of science.

== Article ==
Sokal reasoned that if the presumption of editorial laziness was correct, the nonsensical content of his article would be irrelevant to whether the editors would publish it. What would matter would be ideological obsequiousness, fawning references to deconstructionist writers, and sufficient quantities of the appropriate jargon. After the article was published and the hoax revealed, he wrote:

The results of my little experiment demonstrate, at the very least, that some fashionable sectors of the American academic Left have been getting intellectually lazy. The editors of Social Text liked my article because they liked its conclusion: that "the content and methodology of postmodern science provide powerful intellectual support for the progressive political project" [sec. 6]. They apparently felt no need to analyze the quality of the evidence, the cogency of the arguments, or even the relevance of the arguments to the purported conclusion.

=== Content of the article ===
"Transgressing the Boundaries: Towards a Transformative Hermeneutics of Quantum Gravity" proposed that quantum gravity has progressive political implications, and that the "morphogenetic field" could be a valid theory of quantum gravity. (A morphogenetic field is a concept adapted by Rupert Sheldrake in a way that Sokal characterized in the affair's aftermath as "a bizarre New Age idea".) Sokal wrote that the concept of "an external world whose properties are independent of any individual human being" was "dogma imposed by the long post-Enlightenment hegemony over the Western intellectual outlook".

After referring skeptically to the "so-called scientific method", the article declared that "it is becoming increasingly apparent that physical 'reality'" is fundamentally "a social and linguistic construct." It went on to state that because scientific research is "inherently theory-laden and self-referential", it "cannot assert a privileged epistemological status with respect to counterhegemonic narratives emanating from dissident or marginalized communities", and that therefore a "liberatory science" and an "emancipatory mathematics", spurning "the elite caste canon of 'high science'", needed to be established for a "postmodern science [that] provide[s] powerful intellectual support for the progressive political project."

Moreover, the article's footnotes conflate academic terms with sociopolitical rhetoric, e.g.:

Just as liberal feminists are frequently content with a minimal agenda of legal and social equality for women and "pro-choice", so liberal (and even some socialist) mathematicians are often content to work within the hegemonic Zermelo–Fraenkel framework (which, reflecting its nineteenth-century liberal origins, already incorporates the axiom of equality) supplemented only by the axiom of choice.

=== Publication ===
Sokal submitted the article to Social Text, whose editors were collecting articles for the "Science Wars" issue. "Transgressing the Boundaries" was notable as an article by a natural scientist; biologist Ruth Hubbard also had an article in the issue. Later, after Sokal revealed the hoax in Lingua Franca, Social Text's editors wrote that they had requested editorial changes that Sokal refused to make, and had had concerns about the quality of the writing: "We requested him (a) to excise a good deal of the philosophical speculation and (b) to excise most of his footnotes." Still, despite calling Sokal a "difficult, uncooperative author", and noting that such writers were "well known to journal editors", based on Sokal's credentials Social Text published the article in the May 1996 Spring/Summer "Science Wars" issue. The editors did not seek peer review of the article by physicists or otherwise; they later defended this decision on the basis that Social Text was a journal of open intellectual inquiry and the article was not offered as a contribution to physics.

== Responses ==
=== Follow-up between Sokal and the editors ===
In the article "A Physicist Experiments With Cultural Studies" in the May 1996 issue of Lingua Franca, Sokal revealed that "Transgressing the Boundaries" was a hoax and concluded that Social Text "felt comfortable publishing an article on quantum physics without bothering to consult anyone knowledgeable in the subject" because of its ideological proclivities and editorial bias.

In their defense, Social Text's editors said they believed that Sokal's essay "was the earnest attempt of a professional scientist to seek some kind of affirmation from postmodern philosophy for developments in his field" and that "its status as parody does not alter, substantially, our interest in the piece, itself, as a symptomatic document." Besides criticizing his writing style, Social Text's editors accused Sokal of behaving unethically in deceiving them.

Sokal said the editors' response demonstrated the problem that he sought to identify. Social Text, as an academic journal, published the article not because it was faithful, true, and accurate to its subject, but because an "academic authority" had written it and because of the appearance of the obscure writing. The editors said they considered it poorly written but published it because they felt Sokal was an academic seeking their intellectual affirmation. Sokal remarked:

My goal isn't to defend science from the barbarian hordes of lit crit (we'll survive just fine, thank you), but to defend the Left from a trendy segment of itself. ... There are hundreds of important political and economic issues surrounding science and technology. Sociology of science, at its best, has done much to clarify these issues. But sloppy sociology, like sloppy science, is useless, or even counterproductive.

He claimed that Social Text's response revealed that none of the editors had suspected his piece was a parody. Instead, they speculated his admission "represented a change of heart, or a folding of his intellectual resolve". Sokal found further humor in the idea that the article's absurdity was hard to spot:

In the second paragraph I declare without the slightest evidence or argument, that "physical 'reality' (note the scare quotes) ... is at bottom a social and linguistic construct." Not our theories of physical reality, mind you, but the reality itself. Fair enough. Anyone who believes that the laws of physics are mere social conventions is invited to try transgressing those conventions from the windows of my apartment. I live on the twenty-first floor.

=== Book by Sokal and Bricmont ===
In 1997, Sokal and Jean Bricmont co-wrote Impostures intellectuelles (published in the US as Fashionable Nonsense: Postmodern Intellectuals' Abuse of Science and in the UK as Intellectual Impostures, 1998). The book featured analysis of extracts from established intellectuals' writings that Sokal and Bricmont claimed misused scientific terminology. It closed with a critical summary of postmodernism and criticism of the strong programme of social constructionism in the sociology of scientific knowledge.

In 2008, Sokal published a followup book, Beyond the Hoax, which revisited the history of the hoax and discussed its lasting implications.

=== Jacques Derrida ===
The French philosopher Jacques Derrida, whose 1966 statement about Einstein's theory of relativity was quoted in Sokal's paper, was singled out for criticism, particularly in U.S. newspaper coverage of the hoax. One weekly magazine used two images of him, a photo and a caricature, to illustrate a "dossier" on Sokal's paper. Arkady Plotnitsky commented:

Even given Derrida's status as an icon of intellectual controversy on the Anglo-American cultural scene, it is remarkable that out of thousands of pages of Derrida's published works, a single extemporaneous remark on relativity made in 1966 (before Derrida was "the Derrida" and, in a certain sense, even before "deconstruction") ... is made to stand for nearly all of deconstructive or even postmodernist (not a term easily, if at all, applicable to Derrida) treatments of science.

Derrida later responded to the hoax in "Sokal et Bricmont ne sont pas sérieux" ("Sokal and Bricmont Aren't Serious"), first published on November 20, 1997, in Le Monde. He called Sokal's action "sad" for having trivialized Sokal's mathematical work and "ruining the chance to carefully examine controversies" about scientific objectivity. Derrida then faulted him and Bricmont for what he considered "an act of intellectual bad faith" in their follow-up book, Impostures intellectuelles: they had published two articles almost simultaneously, one in English in The Times Literary Supplement on October 17, 1997 and one in French in Libération on October 18–19, 1997, but while the two articles were almost identical, they differed in how they treated Derrida.

The English-language article had a list of French intellectuals who were not included in Sokal's and Bricmont's book: "Such well-known thinkers as Althusser, Barthes, and Foucault—who, as readers of the TLS will be well aware, have always had their supporters and detractors on both sides of the Channel—appear in our book only in a minor role, as cheerleaders for the texts we criticize." The French-language list, however, included Derrida: "Des penseurs célèbres tels qu'Althusser, Barthes, Derrida et Foucault sont essentiellement absents de notre livre" ("Famous thinkers such as Althusser, Barthes, Derrida and Foucault are essentially absent from our book").

According to Brian Reilly, Derrida may also have been sensitive to another difference between the French and English versions of Impostures intellectuelles. In the French, his citation from the original hoax article is said to be an "isolated" instance of abuse, whereas the English text adds a parenthetical remark that Derrida's work contained "no systematic misuse (or indeed attention to) science".

Sokal and Bricmont insisted that the difference between the articles was "banal". Nevertheless, Derrida concluded that Sokal was not serious in his method, but had used the spectacle of a "quick practical joke" to displace the scholarship Derrida believed the public deserved.

=== Criticism of social sciences ===
Sociologist Stephen Hilgartner, chairman of Cornell University's science and technology studies department, wrote "The Sokal Affair in Context" (1997), comparing Sokal's hoax to "Confirmational Response: Bias Among Social Work Journals" (1990), an article by William M. Epstein published in Science, Technology, & Human Values. Epstein used a similar method to Sokal's, submitting fictitious articles to real academic journals to measure their response. Though much more systematic than Sokal's work, it received scant media attention. Hilgartner argued that the "asymmetric" effect of the successful Sokal hoax compared with Epstein's experiment cannot be attributed to its quality, but that "[t]hrough a mechanism that resembles confirmatory bias, audiences may apply less stringent standards of evidence and ethics to attacks on targets that they are predisposed to regard unfavorably." As a result, according to Hilgartner, though competent in terms of method, Epstein's experiment was largely muted by the more socially accepted social work discipline he critiqued, while Sokal's attack on cultural studies, despite lacking experimental rigor, was accepted. Hilgartner also argued that Sokal's hoax reinforced the views of well-known pundits such as George Will and Rush Limbaugh, so that his opinions were amplified by media outlets predisposed to agree with his argument.

The Sokal Affair extended from academia to the public press. Anthropologist Bruno Latour, who was criticized in Fashionable Nonsense, described the scandal as a "tempest in a teacup". Retired Northeastern University mathematician and social scientist Gabriel Stolzenberg wrote essays criticizing the statements of Sokal and his allies, arguing that they insufficiently grasped the philosophy they criticized, rendering their criticism meaningless. In Social Studies of Science, Bricmont and Sokal responded to Stolzenberg, denouncing his representations of their work and criticizing his commentary about the "strong programme" of the sociology of science. Stolzenberg replied in the same issue that their critique and allegations of misrepresentation were based on misreadings. He advised readers to slowly and skeptically examine the arguments of each party, bearing in mind that "the obvious is sometimes the enemy of the true". In her 1998 article "The Sokal Hoax: At Whom Are We Laughing?", philosopher of science Mara Beller compared the "awe" physicists feel for Bohr's obscurity to their "contempt" for Derrida's density.

== Influence ==
=== Sociological follow-up study ===
In 2009, Cornell sociologist Robb Willer performed an experiment in which undergraduate students read Sokal's paper and were told either that it was written by another student or that it was by a famous academic. He found that students who believed the paper's author was a high-status intellectual rated it better in quality and intelligibility.

=== Sokal III ===
In October 2021, the scholarly journal Higher Education Quarterly published a bogus article "authored" by "Sage Owens" and "Kal Avers-Lynde III". The initials stand for "Sokal III". The Quarterly retracted the article.

== See also ==
- Science wars
- Academese
- Appeal to ridicule – Type of logical fallacy
- Bogdanov affair – 2002 French academic dispute, sometimes referred to as a reverse Sokal hoax
- Chip Morningstar – American software developer and author, a software developer known for his early hoax involving postmodern deconstruction at the 2nd International Conference on Cyberspace in 1991
- Demarcation problem – Philosophical question of how to distinguish between science and non-science
- Dr. Fox effect – Correlation in educational psychology, an actor gave a lecture to a group of experts with almost no content but was praised
- The Ern Malley affair, Australia's most infamous literary hoax
- List of scholarly publishing stings – List of nonsense papers that were accepted by an academic journal or conference
- Paper generator – Software to create fake academic articles
- Postmodernism Generator – Computer program, a program that produces imitations of postmodernist writing
- Grievance studies affair – Group of bogus academic papers (2018), also called "Sokal Squared"
