= Science wars =

1990s dispute in philosophy of science

The science wars were a series of scholarly and public discussions in the 1990s over the social place of science in making authoritative claims about the world.

The science wars took place principally in the United States in the 1990s in the academic and mainstream press. Scientific realists (such as Norman Levitt, Paul R. Gross, Jean Bricmont and Alan Sokal) accused many writers, whom they described as 'postmodernist', of having effectively rejected scientific objectivity, the scientific method, empiricism, and scientific knowledge.

Though much of the theory associated with 'postmodernism' (see post-structuralism) did not make any interventions into the natural sciences, the scientific realists took aim at its general influence. The scientific realists argued that large swathes of scholarship, amounting to a rejection of objectivity and realism, had been influenced by major 20th-century post-structuralist philosophers (such as Jacques Derrida, Gilles Deleuze, Jean-François Lyotard and others), whose work they declare to be incomprehensible or meaningless. They implicate a broad range of fields in this trend, including cultural studies, feminist studies, comparative literature, media studies, and especially science and technology studies, which does apply such methods to the study of science.

Physicist N. David Mermin understands the science wars as a series of exchanges between scientists and "sociologists, historians and literary critics" who the scientists "thought ...were ludicrously ignorant of science, making all kinds of nonsensical pronouncements. The other side dismissed these charges as naive, ill-informed and self-serving." Sociologist Harry Collins wrote that the "science wars" began "in the early 1990s with attacks by natural scientists or ex-natural scientists who had assumed the role of spokespersons for science. The subject of the attacks was the analysis of science coming out of literary studies and the social sciences."

== Historical background ==
Until the mid-20th century, the philosophy of science had concentrated on the viability of scientific method and knowledge, proposing justifications for the truth of scientific theories and observations and attempting to discover at a philosophical level why science worked. Karl Popper, an early opponent of logical positivism in the 20th century, repudiated the classical observationalist/inductivist form of scientific method in favour of empirical falsification. He is also known for his opposition to the classical justificationist/verificationist account of knowledge which he replaced with critical rationalism, "the first non justificational philosophy of criticism in the history of philosophy". His criticisms of scientific method were adopted by several postmodernist critiques.

In 1922, the Einstein-Bergson debate sparked controversy over the reconcilability of philosophical and scientific accounts of the nature of time. In a chapter of the original French version of Fashionable Nonsense, Alan Sokal and Jean Bricmont attack Bergson as irrationalist and posit that "historical origin" of the science wars lies in the humanities' refusal to repudiate Bergson's thought after the debate.

A number of 20th-century philosophers maintained that logical models of pure science do not apply to actual scientific practice. It was the publication of Thomas Kuhn's The Structure of Scientific Revolutions in 1962, however, which fully opened the study of science to new disciplines by suggesting that the evolution of science was in part socially determined and that it did not operate under the simple logical laws put forward by the logical positivist school of philosophy.

Kuhn described the development of scientific knowledge not as a linear increase in truth and understanding, but as a series of periodic revolutions which overturned the old scientific order and replaced it with new orders (what he called "paradigms"). Kuhn attributed much of this process to the interactions and strategies of the human participants in science rather than its own innate logical structure. (See sociology of scientific knowledge).

Some interpreted Kuhn's ideas to mean that scientific theories were, either wholly or in part, social constructs, which many interpreted as diminishing the claim of science to representing objective reality, and that reality had a lesser or potentially irrelevant role in the formation of scientific theories. In 1971, Jerome Ravetz published Scientific knowledge and its social problems, a book describing the role that the scientific community, as a social construct, plays in accepting or rejecting objective scientific knowledge.

=== Postmodernism ===
A number of different philosophical and historical schools, often grouped together as "postmodernism", began reinterpreting scientific achievements of the past through the lens of the practitioners, often positing the influence of politics and economics in the development of scientific theories in addition to scientific observations. Rather than being presented as working entirely from positivistic observations, many scientists of the past were scrutinized for their connection to issues of gender, sexual orientation, race, and class. Some more radical philosophers, such as Paul Feyerabend, argued that scientific theories were themselves incoherent and that other forms of knowledge production (such as those used in religion) served the material and spiritual needs of their practitioners with equal validity as did scientific explanations.

Imre Lakatos advanced a midway view between the "postmodernist" and "realist" camps. For Lakatos, scientific knowledge is progressive; however, it progresses not by a strict linear path where every new element builds upon and incorporates every other, but by an approach where a "core" of a "research program" is established by auxiliary theories which can themselves be falsified or replaced without compromising the core. Social conditions and attitudes affect how strongly one attempts to resist falsification for the core of a program, but the program has an objective status based on its relative explanatory power. Resisting falsification only becomes ad-hoc and damaging to knowledge when an alternate program with greater explanatory power is rejected in favor of another with less. But because it is changing a theoretical core, which has broad ramifications for other areas of study, accepting a new program is also revolutionary as well as progressive. Thus, for Lakatos the character of science is that of being both revolutionary and progressive; both socially informed and objectively justified.

== The science wars ==
In Higher Superstition: The Academic Left and Its Quarrels With Science (1994), scientists Paul R. Gross and Norman Levitt accused postmodernists of anti-intellectualism, presented the shortcomings of relativism, and suggested that postmodernists knew little about the scientific theories they criticized and practiced poor scholarship for political reasons. The authors insist that the "science critics" misunderstood the theoretical approaches they criticized, given their "caricature, misreading, and condescension, [rather] than argument". The book sparked the so-called science wars. Higher Superstition inspired a New York Academy of Sciences conference titled The Flight from Science and Reason, organized by Gross, Levitt, and Gerald Holton. Attendees of the conference were critical of the polemical approach of Gross and Levitt, yet agreed upon the intellectual inconsistency of how laymen, non-scientist, and social studies intellectuals dealt with science.

=== Social Text ===
In 1996, Social Text, a left-wing Duke University publication of postmodern critical theory, compiled a "Science Wars" issue containing brief articles by postmodernist academics in the social sciences and the humanities, that emphasized the roles of society and politics in science. In the introduction to the issue, the Social Text editor, activist Andrew Ross, said that the attack upon science studies was a conservative reaction to reduced funding for scientific research. He characterized the Flight from Science and Reason conference as an attempted "linking together a host of dangerous threats: scientific creationism, New Age alternatives and cults, astrology, UFO-ism, the radical science movement, postmodernism, and critical science studies, alongside the ready-made historical specters of Aryan-Nazi science and the Soviet error of Lysenkoism" that "degenerated into name-calling".

In another Social Text article, the postmodern sociologist Dorothy Nelkin characterised Gross and Levitt's vigorous response as a "call to arms in response to the failed marriage of Science and the State"—in contrast to the scientists' historical tendency to avoid participating in perceived political threats, such as creation science, the animal rights movement, and anti-abortionists' attempts to curb fetal research. At the end of the Soviet–American Cold War (1945–91), military funding of science declined, while funding agencies demanded accountability, and research became directed by private interests. Nelkin suggested that postmodernist critics were "convenient scapegoats" who diverted attention from problems in science.

Also in 1996, physicist Alan Sokal had submitted an article to Social Text titled "Transgressing the Boundaries: Towards a Transformative Hermeneutics of Quantum Gravity", which proposed that quantum gravity is a linguistic and social construct and that quantum physics supports postmodernist criticisms of scientific objectivity. The staff published it in the "Science Wars" issue as a relevant contribution, later claiming that they held the article back from earlier issues due to Sokal's alleged refusal to consider revisions. Later, in the May 1996 issue of Lingua Franca, in the article "A Physicist Experiments With Cultural Studies", Sokal exposed his parody-article, "Transgressing the Boundaries" as an experiment testing the intellectual rigor of an academic journal that would "publish an article liberally salted with nonsense if (a) it sounded good and (b) it flattered the editors' ideological preconceptions". The matter became known as the "Sokal Affair" and brought greater public attention to the wider conflict.

Jacques Derrida, a frequent target of anti-relativist and anti-postmodern criticism in the wake of Sokal's article, responded to the hoax in "Sokal and Bricmont Aren't Serious", first published in Le Monde. He called Sokal's action sad (triste) for having overshadowed Sokal's mathematical work and ruined the chance to sort out controversies of scientific objectivity in a careful way. Derrida went on to fault him and co-author Jean Bricmont for what he considered an act of intellectual bad faith: they had accused him of scientific incompetence in the English edition of a follow-up book (an accusation several English reviewers noted), but deleted the accusation from the French edition and denied that it had ever existed. He concluded, as the title indicates, that Sokal was not serious in his approach, but had used the spectacle of a "quick practical joke" to displace the scholarship Derrida believed the public deserved.

=== Continued conflict ===
In the first few years after the 'Science Wars' edition of Social Text, the seriousness and volume of discussion increased significantly, much of it focused on reconciling the 'warring' camps of postmodernists and scientists. One significant event was the 'Science and Its Critics' conference in early 1997; it brought together scientists and scholars who study science and featured Alan Sokal and Steve Fuller as keynote speakers. The conference generated the final wave of substantial press coverage (in both news media and scientific journals), though by no means resolved the fundamental issues of social construction and objectivity in science.

Other attempts have been made to reconcile the two camps. Mike Nauenberg, a physicist at the University of California, Santa Cruz, organized a small conference in May 1997 that was attended by scientists and sociologists of science alike, among them Alan Sokal, N. David Mermin and Harry Collins. In the same year, Collins organized the Southampton Peace Workshop, which again brought together a broad range of scientists and sociologists. The Peace Workshop gave rise to the idea of a book that intended to map out some of the arguments between the disputing parties. The One Culture?: A Conversation about Science, edited by chemist Jay A. Labinger and sociologist Harry Collins, was eventually published in 2001. The book's title is a reference to C. P. Snow's The Two Cultures. It contains contributions from authors such as Alan Sokal, Jean Bricmont, Steven Weinberg, and Steven Shapin.

Other significant publications related to the science wars include Fashionable Nonsense by Sokal and Jean Bricmont (1998), The Social Construction of What? by Ian Hacking (1999) and Who Rules in Science by James Robert Brown (2004).

To John C. Baez, the Bogdanov Affair in 2002 served as the bookend to the Sokal controversy: the review, acceptance, and publication of papers, later alleged to be nonsense, in peer-reviewed physics journals. Cornell physics professor Paul Ginsparg, argued that the cases are not at all similar and that the fact that some journals and scientific institutions have low standards is "hardly a revelation". The new editor in chief of the journal Annals of Physics, who was appointed after the controversy along with a new editorial staff, had said that the standards of the journal had been poor leading up to the publication since the previous editor had become sick and died.

Interest in the science wars has waned considerably in recent years. Though the events of the science wars are still occasionally mentioned in the mainstream press, they have had little effect on either the scientific community or the community of critical theorists. Both sides continue to maintain that the other does not understand their theories, or mistakes constructive criticisms and scholarly investigations for attacks. In 1999, the French sociologist Bruno Latour—at the time believing that the natural sciences are socially constructivist—said, "Scientists always stomp around meetings talking about 'bridging the two-culture gap', but when scores of people from outside the sciences begin to build just that bridge, they recoil in horror and want to impose the strangest of all gags on free speech since Socrates: only scientists should speak about science!" Subsequently, Latour has suggested a re-evaluation of sociology's epistemology based on lessons learned from the Science Wars: "... scientists made us realize that there was not the slightest chance that the type of social forces we use as a cause could have objective facts as their effects".

Reviewing Sokal's Beyond the Hoax, Mermin stated that "As a sign that the science wars are over, I cite the 2008 election of Bruno Latour [...] to Foreign Honorary Membership in that bastion of the establishment, the American Academy of Arts and Sciences" and opined that "we are not only beyond Sokal's hoax, but beyond the science wars themselves".

However, more recently, some of the leading critical theorists have recognized that their critiques have, at times, been counter-productive and are providing intellectual ammunition for reactionary interests.

Writing about these developments in the context of global warming, Latour noted that "dangerous extremists are using the very same argument of social construction to destroy hard-won evidence that could save our lives. Was I wrong to participate in the invention of this field known as science studies? Is it enough to say that we did not really mean what we said?"

Kendrick Frazier notes that Latour is interested in helping to rebuild trust in science and that Latour has said that some of the authority of science needs to be regained.

In 2016, Shawn Lawrence Otto, in his book The War on Science: Who's Waging It, Why It Matters, and What We can Do About It, contends that the winners of the war on science "will chart the future of power, democracy, and freedom itself."

Commenting on the political conflict around the science wars and its lingering effects in popular consciousness, anarchist author and trained physicist William Gillis argues in the 2025 book Did The Science Wars Take Place? The Political & Ethical Stakes of Radical Realism that "[t]he result of both the conservative and postmodernist narratives is to dissuade anyone from looking into the actual history and context of the science wars, as well as to collapse away the existence of the radicals and leftists who opposed postmodernism."

== See also ==
- Chomsky–Foucault debate
- Culture war
- Deconstruction
- Grievance studies affair
- Historiography of science
- Nature versus nurture
- Normative science
- Positivism
- Positivism dispute
- Science for the People
- Scientific rationalism
- Scientism
- Searle–Derrida debate
- Strong programme
- Suppressed research in the Soviet Union
- Teissier affair
