= Peter S. Fosl =

American academic

Peter Stanley Fosl (born Peter Stanley Wasel on March 15, 1963) is Professor of Philosophy at Transylvania University in Lexington, Kentucky, and the winner of a 2006 Acorn Award for outstanding professor in Kentucky.

== Education and professional life ==
Fosl graduated from Freedom High School in 1981 and then summa cum laude and Phi Beta Kappa from Bucknell University in 1985 with Bachelor of Arts degrees in both philosophy and economics; he spent the Lent Term of 1984 at the London School of Economics. In 1986, Fosl became a Woodruff Fellow at Emory University in Atlanta, Georgia, winning Emory's Award for Excellence in Graduate Research in 1989 and taking a Master of Arts in Philosophy the following year. During the 1990–91 academic year, Fosl was a Fulbright Student at the University of Edinburgh. In 1992 Fosl received his Ph.D. in Philosophy from Emory, writing his dissertation under the direction of Donald W. Livingston.

From 1992 to 1998 Fosl worked as an assistant professor at Hollins College outside Roanoke, Virginia, where he was tenured and promoted to associate professor in early 1998. Later that same year, Fosl took an appointment as associate professor of philosophy at Transylvania University where he received a Bingham Award for Teaching Excellence; he has chaired the philosophy program there since 1999. In 2004, Fosl was promoted to full professor and in 2005 named Transylvania's Professor of the Year. From 2004 to 2006, Fosl was Transylvania's Bingham-Young Professor, a circulating endowed professorship, and director of the university's Bingham-Young program on Liberty, Security and Justice.

In 2006, Fosl was honored with the Acorn Award as outstanding professor in the state of Kentucky at a four-year public or private university (a second Acorn recognizes a Kentucky community college professor). Fosl's award noted "[t]he outstanding quality of his teaching, expertise in his fields of study, the originality of courses and scholarship, and the role he plays as a mentor...." That same year he was named a Kentucky Colonel.

Fosl is co-editor of the two-volume British Philosophers 1500–1799 and 1800–2000 (published by Thomson Gale) and co-author with Julian Baggini of The Philosopher's Toolkit (second edition 2010) and The Ethics Toolkit (both published by Blackwell Publishing). With David E. Cooper he edited Philosophy: The Classic Readings (Wiley-Blackwell, 2010). He is the editor of The Big Lebowski and Philosophy and has contributed essays to the Blackwell philosophy and popular culture series edited by William Irwin.

Fosl is the author of various articles and books on the history of philosophy, skepticism, David Hume, the philosophy of religion, ethics, and philosophical method; he has published in Hume Studies, the Journal of the History of Philosophy, and 1650-1850.net. He has been a contributing editor to The Philosophers' Magazine, and a panelist with AskPhilosophers.org.

== Personal life ==
Fosl hails from Bethlehem, Pennsylvania. He resides in Louisville, Kentucky. He remains a member of the Louisville Monthly Meeting of the Religious Society of Friends (or Quakers).
