= Ophelia Benson =

American writer

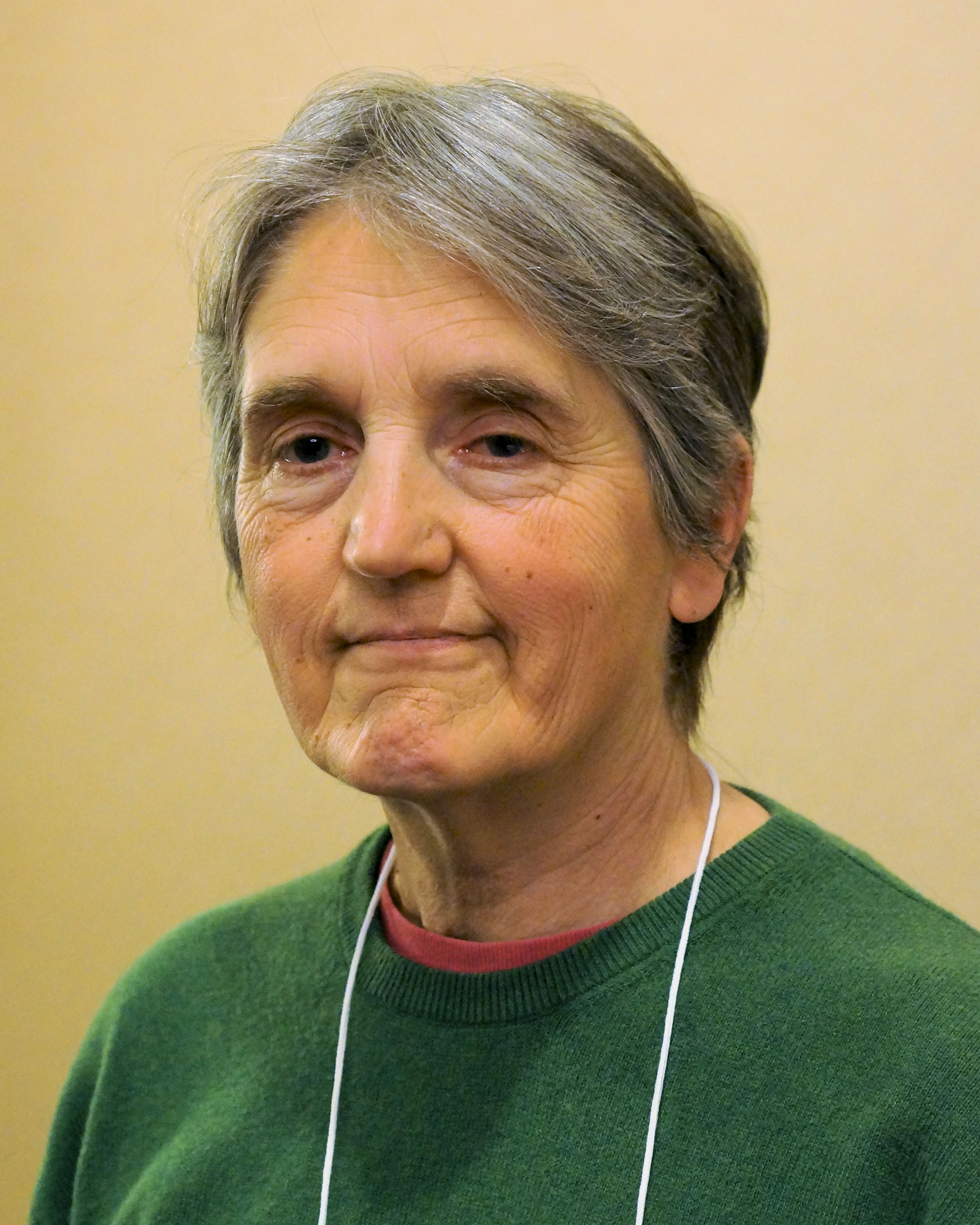
- Benson at CFI Women in Secularism conference, May 18, 2012
- Born: 1948 (age 77–78); New Jersey, U.S.
- Occupations: Writer, editor, blogger
- Website: butterfliesandwheels.org freethoughtblogs.com/butterfliesandwheels (formerly)

Ophelia Benson (born 1948) is an American author, editor, blogger, and feminist. Benson is the editor of the website Butterflies and Wheels and a columnist and former associate editor of The Philosophers' Magazine. She is also a columnist for Free Inquiry.

Her books and website aim to defend objectivity and scientific truth against what she sees as threats to rational thinking posed by religious fundamentalism, pseudoscience, wishful thinking, postmodernism, relativism, and "the tendency of the political Left to subjugate the rational assessment of truth-claims to the demands of a variety of pre-existing political and moral frameworks". Her website is called Butterflies and Wheels because, according to the website itself, "Mary Midgley borrowed Alexander Pope’s witticism about breaking a butterfly upon a wheel, only she did it wrong."

== Background ==
Benson was born in New Jersey, and attended university in the United States, before working in a variety of jobs, including being a zookeeper for several years, before becoming an author.

== Published works ==
In 2004, Benson co-authored The Dictionary of Fashionable Nonsense with Jeremy Stangroom. It is a satire on post-modernism, modern jargon and anti-rationalist thinking in contemporary academia. The Times Literary Supplement said "With wit and invention, Benson and Stangroom take us through the checklist argot that so often litters postmodern texts."

In 2006, Benson and Stangroom published Why Truth Matters, which examines the "spurious claims made for creationism, Holocaust denial, misinterpretation of evolutionary biology, identity history, science as mere social construct, and other 'paradigms' that prop up the habit of shaping our findings according to what we want to find".

In 2009, Benson co-authored Does God Hate Women? with Stangroom. The book explores the oppression of women in the name of religious and cultural norms, and how these issues play out both in the community and in the political arena.
