= Gabriel Stolzenberg =

American mathematician (1937–2019)

- Born: 1937; Brooklyn, New York
- Died: 19 November 2019 (aged 81–82); Watertown, Massachusetts
- Citizenship: American
- Education: Columbia University; Massachusetts Institute of Technology
- Known for: Mathematics; Involvement in the science wars

Gabriel Stolzenberg (Brooklyn, New York, 1937 – Watertown, Massachusetts, 2019) was an American mathematician who taught at various academic institutions.

== Early years and education ==
Stolzenberg was born in Brooklyn, New York to Aba Stolzenberg (1905–1966), a Yiddish poet, and Florence Stolzenberg, also known as Bluma. His father and other Yiddish artists would often gather around poet Zishe Landau. His elder sister, Ethel, participated in a social club for young Jewish girls in Crown Heights, called Faithful Friends Forever Club. This club was established around 1938. Ethel went on to receive a Ph.D. in Biophysics from Yale University. Later, she and her husband, Irwin Tessman, were inducted as members of the biological sciences faculty at Purdue.

Stolzenberg attended Stuyvesant High School. At the age of sixteen, he went to Israel, where he joined a kibbutz for one year. Returning to the States, he entered Columbia University on a Ford Foundation scholarship to study Mathematics. He graduated in 1958 and went on to receive his Ph.D. in Mathematics from the Massachusetts Institute of Technology in 1961.

== Teaching ==
Stolzenberg was Benjamin Peirce Instructor at Harvard. He also taught at Brown and other northeastern institutions, such as Boston University. He held visiting positions at Berkeley and in Paris. His research field included the theory of functions with several complex variables and Banach algebras. He published primarily in the Annals of Mathematics and the Acta Mathematica.

== Philosopher of science ==
Stolzenberg, influenced by the work of Errett Bishop, was a constructivist in the philosophy of mathematics, as well as in science education.

He was an active participant in the so-called "science wars", (Note: Stolzenberg has contributed to the talk page of the Science Wars article in Wikipedia.) defending post-modernism and constructivism against the positions held by scientists and philosophers, as well as against accusations of relativism. Solzenberg engaged publicly and for many years in a dialogue with opponents of the postmodernist approach to sciences and of the use of concepts of physics, mathematics, or chemistry in philosophy and the social sciences, attracting commentary across both positive and social sciences and drawing wider attention to these issues.

== Selected works ==
=== Articles ===
- Stolzenberg, Gabriel (1966). "Uniform approximation on smooth curves". Acta Mathematica. 1: 185–198. doi:10.1007/BF02392207.

=== Books ===
- Stolzenberg, Gabriel (1966). Volumes, Limits and Extensions of Analytic Varieties. Lecture Notes in Mathematics. Springer-Verlag. ISBN 978-3-540-03602-9.
- Stolzenberg, Gabriel (1980). "Can an Inquiry into the Foundations of Mathematics Tell Us Anything Interesting about Mind?". In Watzlawick, Paul (ed.). The Invented Reality: How Do We Know What We Believe We Know?. W. W. Norton .

== Private life ==
Stolzenberg married Judith Levine (b. 1938) soon after graduating from Columbia in 1958. He met his second wife, mathematician Nancy Kopell (b.1942), while they were both serving at the faculty of Boston University. Stolzenberg and Levine had two children, Nomi and Daniel Stolzenberg.

Nomi joined the USC Gould School of Law faculty in 1988, with her research focusing mainly on the relationship of law with religion, liberalism, psychoanalysis, and literature. Daniel went on to receive a PhD in History from Stanford and serve as a historian of knowledge in UC Davis, specializing in early modern Europe. In 2014, Daniel received the Howard R. Marraro Prize for the best book on Italian History published that year. He mainly researches the history of science and scholarship from the Renaissance to the Enlightenment.

Gabriel Stolzenberg and novelist Cormac McCarthy were close friends.

== Death ==
Stolzenberg died on 19 November 2019, at the age of 82, while being treated for a neurological disorder in Watertown, Massachusetts.

== See also ==
- Sokal affair
