= Bruce Robbins =

Bruce Robbins may refer to:

- Bruce Robbins (academic) (born 1949), American academic
- Bruce Robbins (baseball) (born 1959), American former baseball pitcher
