= Jean Kazez =

American philosopher

Jean Kazez is an American philosopher who writes on applied ethics, including questions around animals, gender, and parenthood. She teaches at the Southern Methodist University and is an editor of The Philosophers' Magazine.

== Education and career ==
Kazez read for BAs in philosophy and classics at Pennsylvania State University, graduating in 1977. She went on to read for an MA in philosophy at Boston University, graduating in 1985, and then a PhD in philosophy at the University of Arizona. Her thesis, Mental representation and causal explanation, which she submitted in 1990, was supervised by Rob Cummins.

Kazez lectured for a year at the University of Texas, Austin before taking up an assistant professorship at the Southern Methodist University (SMU) in 1991. She resigned in 1996, and has since taught as an adjunct at SMU.

== Work ==
Kazez's first book was 2007's The Weight of Things: Philosophy and the Good Life, which argues that there are many ways to live well through engagement with historical and contemporary philosophers. Her second was 2010's Animalkind: What We Owe to Animals, which offered an introduction to animal ethics. Kazez criticizes many ways that animals are used, but also rejects philosophical views that, in her view, elevate animals too much, defending a sliding scale of value. Her third book was The Philosophical Parent: Asking the Hard Questions about Having and Raising Children, which was published in 2017. In The Philosophical Parent, in addition to offering some practical advice to parents, Kazez surveys a range of questions explored in philosophical work about parenting. Kazez's public philosophy includes contributing The Philosophers' Magazine in various editorial and columnist capacities.

== Selected publications ==
- 1994. "Computationalism and the Causal Role of Content", Philosophical Studies 75: 231-260. doi:10.1007/BF00989583
- 2007. The Weight of Things: Philosophy and the Good Life. Wiley-Blackwell.
- 2010. Animalkind: What We Owe to Animals, Wiley-Blackwell.
- 2017. The Philosophical Parent: Asking the Hard Questions about Having and Raising Children, Oxford University Press.
- 2018. "The Taste Issue in Animal Ethics", Journal of Applied Philosophy 35 (4): 661-74. doi:10.1111/japp.12278
- 2023. "Old Age as a Stage of Life", Journal of Applied Philosophy 40 (3): 521-34. doi:10.1111/japp.12646
