= Higher Superstition =

1994 book by Paul R. Gross and Norman Levitt

Higher Superstition: The Academic Left and Its Quarrels with Science
- Authors: Paul R. Gross; Norman Levitt
- Language: English
- Subject: Philosophy of science
- Publisher: Johns Hopkins University Press
- Publication date: 1994
- Publication place: United States
- Media type: Print (hardcover and paperback)
- ISBN: 0-8018-5707-4

Higher Superstition: The Academic Left and Its Quarrels with Science is a 1994 book about the philosophy of science by the biologist Paul R. Gross and the mathematician Norman Levitt.

== Summary ==
Levitt states he is a leftist trying to save the "academic left" from itself by exposing misuses and abuses of science to advance political goals.

Topics discussed include: cultural constructivism or social constructivism, the strong programme, the science criticism of Stanley Aronowitz and Bruno Latour, post-modernism and deconstructionism and their influence on American academia, the science criticism of Andrew Ross, feminist science criticism, environmentalist science criticism and "apocalyptic naturism", Jeremy Rifkin's influential "pseudoscientific alarmism", attacks on medical research connected with AIDS activism and animal rights advocacy, and Afrocentrism. The book also questions human activity's relationship with climate change. The authors find it unfortunate that social scientists and literary critics often consider themselves qualified to criticize the natural sciences without learning much about them in detail, and worry about what would replace Enlightenment ideals of universalism and rationalism, and objective truths about the natural world as ascertained by a scientific methodology of repeatable experiments, if these were to be discredited, as many science critics in the humanities wish to do.

== Reception and influence ==
The book inspired the 1996 Sokal hoax, in which Alan Sokal published a bogus paper in Social Text, a postmodernist journal that did not peer-review submissions.

The book has been criticized by Historian of Science Norton Wise. In a review of the book for the History of Science journal Isis, he dismisses the authors critique as misunderstanding what postmodernism, feminist studies, and social constructivism entail. He regards their writings as an awkward attempt at portraying history of science as a complacent teleological story devoid of any cultural influence and states that the author's demands for people who study science to be competent in the natural sciences is understandable but odd, given their own incompetence in historical research and writing.

== See also ==
- Science wars
