= Postmodern Culture =

- Discipline: Cultural studies
- Language: English
- Edited by: Eyal Amiran, Mathias Nilges

Publication details
- History: Since 1990
- Publisher: Johns Hopkins University Press (United States)
- Frequency: Triannual
- Impact factor: 0.1 (2024)

Standard abbreviations
- ISO 4: Postmod. Cult.

Indexing
- ISSN: 1053-1920
- LCCN: sn91019114
- OCLC no.: 22471982

Links
- Journal homepage; Online access at Project Muse; Online archive

Postmodern Culture: Journal of Interdisciplinary Thought on Contemporary Cultures (or PMC) is a triannual peer-reviewed academic journal that publishes commentary and criticism on a wide range of topics, including literary theory, politics, and contemporary society. It occasionally publishes special issues centered on a specific theme within the arena of postmodernism. It has published noted authors and critics including Kathy Acker, Charles Bernstein, bell hooks, Susan Howe, and Bruce Robbins.

PMC was established in 1990 as the first online-only peer-reviewed in the humanities. It is now published by the Johns Hopkins University Press with support from the University of California, Irvine. It maintains a text-only archive of free content at https://www.pomoculture.org/.

The editors-in-chief are Eyal Amiran (University of California, Irvine) and Mathias Nilges (St. Francis Xavier University). The current review editor is Rashmi Varma (University of Warwick).

According to the Journal Citation Reports, the journal has a 2024 impact factor of 0.1.
