= Fashionable Nonsense =

1997 book by Alan Sokal and Jean Bricmont

Fashionable Nonsense: Postmodern Intellectuals' Abuse of Science
- Cover of the first edition
- Authors: Alan Sokal; Jean Bricmont
- Original title: Impostures intellectuelles
- Language: French
- Subjects: Postmodernism; Philosophy of science
- Published: 1997 (Odile Jacob, in French); 1999 (Picador USA, in English)
- Publication place: France
- Media type: Print (Hardcover and Paperback)
- Pages: xiv, 300
- ISBN: 0-312-20407-8
- OCLC: 770940534

Fashionable Nonsense: Postmodern Intellectuals' Abuse of Science (UK: Intellectual Impostures), first published in French in 1997 as Impostures intellectuelles, is a book by physicists Alan Sokal and Jean Bricmont. As part of the so-called science wars, Sokal and Bricmont criticize postmodernism in academia for the misuse of scientific and mathematical concepts in postmodern writing.

The book was published in English in 1998, with revisions to the original French edition for greater relevance to debates in the English-speaking world. According to some reports, the response within the humanities was "polarized"; critics of Sokal and Bricmont charged that they lacked understanding of the writing they were scrutinizing. By contrast, responses from the scientific community were more supportive.

Similar to the subject matter of the book, Sokal is best known for his eponymous 1996 hoaxing affair, whereby he was able to get published a deliberately absurd article that he submitted to Social Text, a critical theory journal. The article itself is included in Fashionable Nonsense as an appendix.

== Summary ==
Fashionable Nonsense examines two related topics:

1. the allegedly incompetent and pretentious usage of scientific concepts by a small group of influential philosophers and intellectuals; and
2. the problems of cognitive relativism—the idea that "modern science is nothing more than a 'myth', a 'narration' or a 'social construction' among many others"—as found in the Strong programme in the sociology of science.

=== Incorrect use of scientific concepts versus scientific metaphors ===
The stated goal of the book is not to attack "philosophy, the humanities or the social sciences in general", but rather "to warn those who work in them (especially students) against some manifest cases of charlatanism." In particular, the authors aim to "deconstruct" the notion that some books and writers are difficult because they deal with profound and complicated ideas: "If the texts seem incomprehensible, it is for the excellent reason that they mean precisely nothing."

Set out to show how numerous key intellectuals have used concepts from the physical sciences and mathematics incorrectly, the authors intentionally provide considerably lengthy extracts in order to avoid accusations of taking sentences out of context. Such extracts pull from such works as those of Jacques Lacan, Julia Kristeva, Paul Virilio, Gilles Deleuze, Félix Guattari, Luce Irigaray, Bruno Latour, and Jean Baudrillard, who—in terms of the quantity of published works, invited presentations, and of citations received—were some of the leading academics of continental philosophy, critical theory, psychoanalysis, and/or the social sciences at the time of publication.

The book provides a chapter to each of the above-mentioned authors, "the tip of the iceberg" of a group of intellectual practices that can be described as "mystification, deliberately obscure language, confused thinking and the misuse of scientific concepts." For example, Irigaray is criticised for asserting that E=mc^{2} is a "sexed equation" because "it privileges the speed of light over other speeds that are vitally necessary to us"; and for asserting that fluid mechanics is unfairly neglected because it deals with "feminine" fluids in contrast to "masculine" rigid mechanics. Similarly, Lacan is criticized for drawing an analogy between topology and mental illness that, in Sokal and Bricmont's view, is unsupported by any argument and is "not just false: it is gibberish."

In a chapter excluded from the English translation, the authors attack Henri Bergson in the context of his debate with Einstein over the theory of relativity, placing the "historical origin" of the science wars in this dispute.

Sokal and Bricmont claim that they do not intend to analyze postmodernist thought in general. Rather, they aim to draw attention to the abuse of concepts from mathematics and physics, their areas of specialty. The authors define this abuse as any of the following behaviors:

- Using scientific or pseudoscientific terminology without bothering much about technical meanings.
- Importing concepts from the natural sciences into the humanities without justification for their use.
- Displaying superficial erudition by using technical terms where they are irrelevant, presumably to impress and intimidate non-specialist readers.
- Manipulating meaningless words and phrases.
- Self-assurance on topics far beyond the competence of the author and exploiting the prestige of science to give discourses a veneer of rigor.

=== The postmodernist conception of science ===
Sokal and Bricmont highlight the rising tide of what they call cognitive relativism, the belief that there are no objective truths but only local beliefs. They argue that this view is held by a number of people, including people who the authors label "postmodernists" and the Strong programme in the sociology of science, and that it is illogical, impractical, and dangerous. Their aim is "not to criticize the left, but to help defend it from a trendy segment of itself." Quoting Michael Albert,

[T]here is nothing truthful, wise, humane, or strategic about confusing hostility to injustice and oppression, which is leftist, with hostility to science and rationality, which is nonsense.

== Reception ==
According to New York Review of Books editor Barbara Epstein, who was delighted by Sokal's hoax, the response to the book within the humanities was bitterly divided, with some delighted and some enraged; in some reading groups, reaction was polarized between impassioned supporters and equally impassioned opponents of Sokal.

=== Support ===
Philosopher Thomas Nagel has supported Sokal and Bricmont, describing their book as consisting largely of "extensive quotations of scientific gibberish from name-brand French intellectuals, together with eerily patient explanations of why it is gibberish," and agreeing that "there does seem to be something about the Parisian scene that is particularly hospitable to reckless verbosity."

Several scientists have expressed similar sentiments. Richard Dawkins, in a review of this book, said regarding the discussion of Lacan:

We do not need the mathematical expertise of Sokal and Bricmont to assure us that the author of this stuff is a fake. Perhaps he is genuine when he speaks of non-scientific subjects? But a philosopher who is caught equating the erectile organ to the square root of minus one has, for my money, blown his credentials when it comes to things that I don't know anything about.

Noam Chomsky called the book "very important", and said that "a lot of the so-called 'left' criticism [of science] seems to be pure nonsense."

=== Criticism ===
Limiting her considerations to physics, science historian Mara Beller maintained that it was not entirely fair to blame contemporary postmodern philosophers for drawing nonsensical conclusions from quantum physics, since many such conclusions were drawn by some of the leading quantum physicists themselves, such as Bohr or Heisenberg when they ventured into philosophy.

==== Regarding Lacan ====
Bruce Fink offers a critique in his book Lacan to the Letter, in which he accuses Sokal and Bricmont of demanding that "serious writing" do nothing other than "convey clear meanings". Fink asserts that some concepts which the authors consider arbitrary or meaningless do have roots in the history of linguistics, and that Lacan is explicitly using mathematical concepts in a metaphoric way, not claiming that his concepts are mathematically founded. He takes Sokal and Bricmont to task for elevating a disagreement with Lacan's choice of writing styles to an attack on his thought, which, in Fink's assessment, they fail to understand. Fink says that "Lacan could easily assume that his faithful seminar public...would go to the library or the bookstore and 'bone up' on at least some of his passing allusions."

Similar to Fink, a review by John Sturrock in the London Review of Books accuses Sokal and Bricmont of "linguistic reductionism", claiming that they misunderstood the genres and language uses of their intended quarries.

This point has been disputed by Arkady Plotnitsky (one of the authors mentioned by Sokal in his original hoax). Plotnitsky says that "some of their claims concerning mathematical objects in question and specifically complex numbers are incorrect", specifically attacking their statement that complex numbers and irrational numbers "have nothing to do with one another". Plotnitsky here defends Lacan's view "of imaginary numbers as an extension of the idea of rational numbers—both in the general conceptual sense, extending to its ancient mathematical and philosophical origins...and in the sense of modern algebra." The first of these two senses refers to the fact that the extension of real numbers to complex numbers mirrors the extension of rationals to reals, as Plotnitsky points out with a quote from Leibniz: "From the irrationals are born the impossible or imaginary quantities whose nature is very strange but whose usefulness is not to be despised."

Plotnitsky nevertheless agrees with Sokal and Bricmont that the "square root of −1" which Lacan discusses (and for which Plotnitsky introduces the symbol $\scriptstyle (L)\sqrt{-1}$) is not, in spite of its identical name, "identical, directly linked, or even metaphorized via the mathematical square root of −1", and that the latter "is not the erectile organ".

==== Regarding Irigaray ====
While Fink and Plotnitsky question Sokal and Bricmont's right to say what definitions of scientific terms are correct, cultural theorists and literary critics Andrew Milner and Jeff Browitt acknowledge that right, seeing it as "defend[ing] their disciplines against what they saw as a misappropriation of key terms and concepts" by writers such as Jacques Lacan and Luce Irigaray. However, they point out that Irigaray might still be correct in asserting that E = mc^{2} is a "masculinist" equation, since "the social genealogy of a proposition has no logical bearing on its truth value." In other words, gender factors may influence which of many possible scientific truths are discovered. They also suggest that, in criticising Irigaray, Sokal and Bricmont sometimes go beyond their area of expertise in the sciences and simply express a differing position on gender politics.

==== Derrida ====
In his response, first published in Le Monde as "Sokal and Bricmont Aren't Serious", Jacques Derrida writes that the Sokal hoax is rather "sad", not only because Alan Sokal's name is now linked primarily to a hoax rather than science, but also because the chance to reflect seriously on this issue has been ruined for a broad public forum that deserves better. Derrida reminds his readers that science and philosophy have long debated their likenesses and differences in the discipline of epistemology, but certainly not with such an emphasis on the nationality of the philosophers or scientists. He calls it ridiculous and weird that there are intensities of treatment by the scientists, in particular, that he was "much less badly treated", when in fact he was the main target of the US press.

Derrida then proceeds to question the validity of their attacks against a few words he made in an off-the-cuff response during a conference that took place thirty years prior to their publication. He suggests there are plenty of scientists who have pointed out the difficulty of attacking his response. He also writes that there is no "relativism" or a critique of Reason and the Enlightenment in his works. He then writes of his hope that in the future this work is pursued more seriously and with dignity at the level of the issues involved.

== See also ==
- Beyond the Hoax
- Cargo cult science
- List of scientific metaphors
- Nonscience
- Not even wrong
- Postmodernism Generator
- The Dictionary of Fashionable Nonsense
