= Jeremy Stangroom =

British journalist

Jeremy Stangroom

Jeremy Stangroom is a British writer, editor, and website designer. He is an editor and co-founder, with Julian Baggini, of The Philosophers’ Magazine, and has written and edited several philosophy books. He is also co-founder, with Ophelia Benson of the website 'Butterflies and Wheels'.

== Education ==
Stangroom was awarded a B.Sc. in sociology in 1985 from Southampton University, an M.Sc. in sociology in 1987 from the London School of Economics (LSE), and a Ph.D. in 1996, also from the LSE, for a thesis entitled "Political mobilisation and the question of subjectivity".

== Books by Stangroom ==
- The Story of Philosophy: A History of Western Thought, 2012. (With James Garvey)
- Does God Hate Women? co-authored with Ophelia Benson
- Identity Crisis: Against Multiculturalism - Continuum Publishing, 2008 ISBN 978-0-8264-9255-5
- Do You Think What You Think You Think? - Granta, 2006 (co-written with Baggini, J.) ISBN 978-1-86207-916-8
- The Little Book of Big Ideas: Philosophy - A & C Black, 2006 ISBN 978-0-7136-7495-8
- Why Truth Matters - Continuum, 2006 (co-written with Benson, O.) ISBN 978-0-8264-7608-1
- Great Philosophers - Arcturus, 2005 (co-written with Garvey. J.)
- What Scientists Think - Routledge, 2005.
- The Dictionary of Fashionable Nonsense: A Guide for Edgy People - Souvenir Press, 2004 (co-written with Benson, O.)
- Great Thinkers A-Z - Continuum, 2004 (co-written with Baggini, J. (eds.))
- What Philosophers Think - Continuum, 2003 (co-written with Baggini, J. (eds.)) ISBN 978-0-8264-6754-6
- New British Philosophy: The interviews - Routledge, 2002 (co-written with Baggini, J. (eds.)) ISBN 978-0415243469
