= Clive Thompson (journalist) =

Canadian science and technology journalist

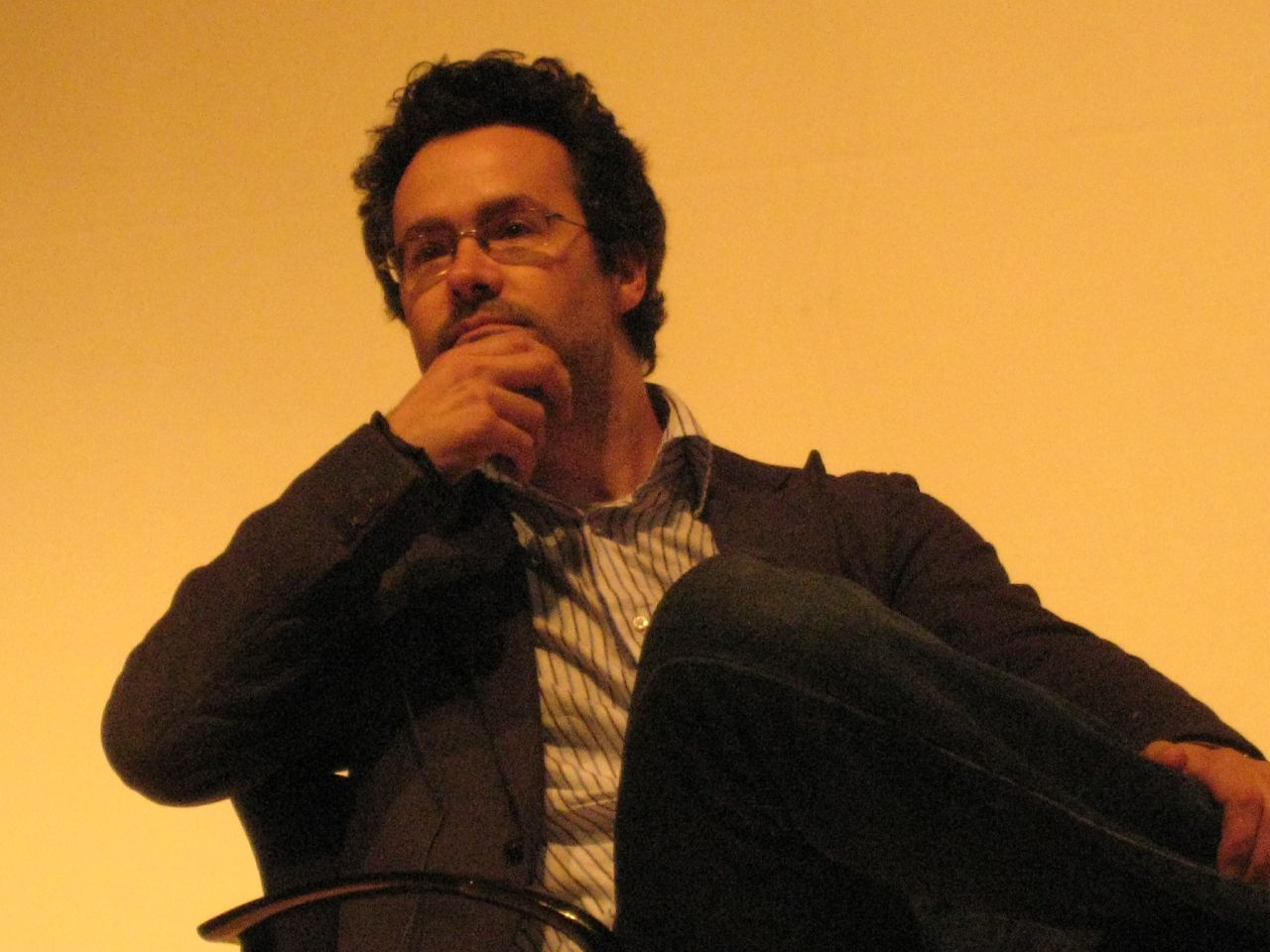
- Thompson at Games for Change conference, 2007
- Born: October 30, 1968 (age 58); Canada
- Occupations: Freelance journalist, blogger, writer
- Spouse: Emily Nussbaum

Thomas Clive Thompson III (born October 30, 1968) is a Canadian freelance journalist, blogger, and science and technology writer.

== Early life and education ==
Thompson grew up in the 1970s and '80s in Toronto, Canada. He spent his childhood working with early models of computers. He tried to understand programs for games and for artificial intelligence as a child but did not succeed, so he chose not to study science. He graduated in 1992 from the University of Toronto with majors in political science and English.

== Professional work ==
Thompson's first journalism jobs were with Canada's Report on Business magazine, This Magazine, and Shift magazine. He then became a freelance contributor to The New York Times Magazine, The Washington Post, Lingua Franca, Wired, Smithsonian, Entertainment Weekly and several other publications. His journalistic beat was digital technologies and their social and cultural impact. He reported on contests between machines and humans, such as the Deep Blue chess computer playing against the world chess champion, and the IBM Watson research team's effort to develop an AI program which could successfully compete on Jeopardy!.

In a manner similar to Nicholas Carr, Thompson has suggested that the advanced technology tools we use are affecting how we think. But Thompson regards this trend with a more sanguine outlook than Carr and other technologists do. In a review of Thompson's 2013 book, Smarter Than You Think, Walter Isaacson writes about the author:

He comes across as a sensible utopian, tending toward the belief that our digital devices and social networks are, on balance, enhancing our lives and improving the world in the same mixed-blessing sort of way that writing, paper, the printing press and the telephone did.

Thompson describes the "global self-expression" afforded to humanity by new forms of media. He introduced the concept of "ambient awareness", or the connections humans develop with each other through quick status updates throughout the day that ultimately end up being deep, intellectual and still social. He acknowledges that ambient contact has caused the world to become overly focused on the present. For him, the Internet is text that can be used to talk, argue, insult and compliment others. In a New Yorker interview, he compared the Internet to cities:

Cities are dynamic—and deeply seductive for the people who flock there—because they broker all sorts of fantastic and useful connections, cultural and economic and social. And the types of face-to-face connections and serendipity that you get in a city are quite different from the ones you get online. That said, there are deep similarities in the things we enjoy about cities and the things we enjoy about the Internet!

He added that he did not believe humanity will be overwhelmed by technology. In his view, humans have always faced, and overcome, new challenges brought on by technology.

Thompson's blog about culture and technology, which he called "Collision Detection", started in 2002 and at its peak attracted over 10,000 readers a day. He retired the blog in 2016 and incorporated it into his website.

== Awards ==
In 2002, Thompson was awarded a Knight Science Journalism Fellowship at MIT.

== Personal life ==
Thompson is married to The New Yorker TV critic Emily Nussbaum. They live in Brooklyn, New York, with their two children. He plays guitar and harmonica in a band called The DeLorean Sisters. He has also written music for the duo Cove.

== Bibliography ==
- Thompson, Clive (2013). Smarter Than You Think: How Technology Is Changing Our Minds for the Better. New York: Penguin. ISBN 978-1594204456.
- Thompson, Clive (2019). Coders: The Making of a New Tribe and the Remaking of the World. New York: Penguin. ISBN 978-0735220560.
