= Why Truth Matters =

- Authors: Ophelia Benson; Jeremy Stangroom
- Subjects: Philosophy, Truth
- Publisher: Continuum
- Publication date: 2006
- Media type: Print
- Pages: 215
- ISBN: 978-0-8264-7608-1
- OCLC: 61151640

Why Truth Matters is a book by Ophelia Benson and Jeremy Stangroom published by Continuum Books in 2006.

It was widely praised on its release, and reviewed in the Times Literary Supplement, The Guardian and the Financial Times.

Author Johann Hari called it "a sassy and profound response to this cascade of superstition and silliness."
