= The Dictionary of Fashionable Nonsense =

2006 book by Ophelia Benson and Jeremy Stangroom

The Dictionary of Fashionable Nonsense: A Guide for Edgy People
- Cover of the first edition
- Authors: Ophelia Benson; Jeremy Stangroom
- Language: English
- Subject: Postmodernism
- Genre: Satire
- Publisher: Souvenir Press
- Publication date: 2006
- Publication place: United Kingdom
- Media type: Print

The Dictionary of Fashionable Nonsense: A Guide for Edgy People is a 2006 book by Ophelia Benson and Jeremy Stangroom.

The book is a satire on postmodernism, modern jargon and anti-rationalist thinking in contemporary academia. "Covering such schools of thought as difference feminism, deconstruction, and the sociology of knowledge, the author reveals that clotted jargon, tortured syntax, and unreadable style hides the fact that nothing new is being said."

The Times Literary Supplement said "With wit and invention, Benson and Stangroom take us through the checklist argot that so often litters postmodern texts." Writing in The Guardian, Ben Marshall called it "a near perfect summary of the banality of postmodern discourse."

The book's authors were interviewed about the book by ABC radio in Australia.

== See also ==
- Fashionable Nonsense
