= Julian Baggini =

English philosopher, author, and journalist

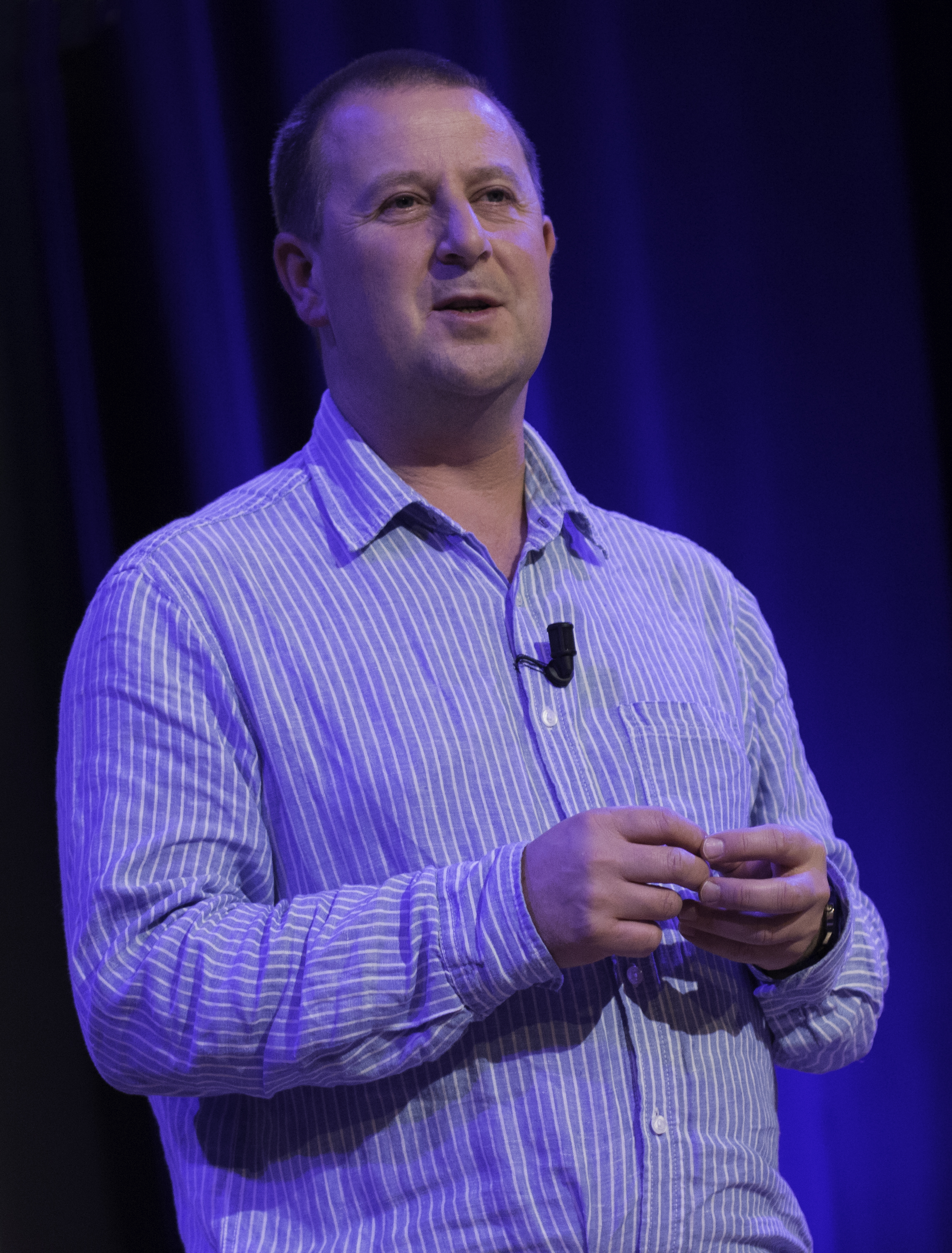
- Baggini in 2014
- Born: 1968 (age 57–58); Folkestone, Kent, England
- Education: University of Reading (BA); University College London (PhD)
- Occupations: Philosopher, writer
- Website: www.julianbaggini.com

Julian Baggini (/bəˈdʒiːni/ bə-JEE-nee, Italian: [badˈdʒiːni]; born 1968) is an English philosopher, journalist and the author of over 20 books about philosophy written for a general audience. He is co-founder of The Philosophers' Magazine, and has written for some newspapers and magazines. In addition to writing on the subject of philosophy he has also written books on atheism, secularism and the nature of national identity. He is a patron of Humanists UK, an organization promoting secular humanism.

== Education ==
Baggini was born in 1968 in Folkestone, the child of an Italian immigrant father and English mother. He grew up in Kent and was educated at the Harvey Grammar School, Folkestone, from 1980 until 1987. He later attended Reading University and gained a bachelor's degree in philosophy in 1990.

In 1996, Baggini was awarded a PhD from University College London for a thesis on the philosophy of personal identity. Baggini is an honorary graduate and honorary research fellow of the University of Kent's department of philosophy.

== Career ==
In 1997, Baggini co-founded The Philosophers' Magazine with Jeremy Stangroom. In 1999, he was a founder of the Humanist Philosophers' Group, then part of the British Humanists Association. He is also a patron of Humanists UK. In 2009, Baggini was philosopher-in-residence at Wellington College, a public school in Berkshire. In 2012, he was also commissioned by the National Trust to be the philosopher-in-residence for the White Cliffs of Dover where he was required to reflect on the chalk cliffs and their significance to the national identity.

Baggini is a columnist for The Guardian, Prospect, the Financial Times, and a columnist and book reviewer for The Wall Street Journal. He has also written for New Humanist, The Week, New Statesman, The New York Times, and Literary Review. In addition to writing many books about the history and common themes of philosophy, he has also written more generally about the philosophy of food, as well as the nature of "Englishness". He speaks regularly at conferences and schools and has frequently spoken out about living without religion, against the teaching in schools of creationism, a loss of reason, which he asserts is "an enemy of mystery and ambiguity", and the benefits of secular education.

His 2018 book, How The World Thinks: A Global History Of Philosophy received a warm critical reception, with The Scotsman describing it as "ingenious and open-hearted", and the Financial Times calling it a "bold, fascinating book". In 2019, Baggini was named academic director of the Royal Institute of Philosophy. He is a member of the British trade union the Society of Authors and also appears in two novels by Alexander McCall Smith in The Sunday Philosophy Club Series.

== Works ==
- New British Philosophy: The interviews - Routledge, 2002 (co-written with L.Alpeart (eds.)).
- Philosophy: Key Themes - Palgrave Macmillan, 2002.
- The Philosopher's Toolkit: A Compendium of Philosophical Concepts and Methods - Blackwell, 2002 (co-written with Peter S. Fosl) ISBN 978-1-4051-9018-3
- Making Sense: Philosophy Behind the Headlines - Oxford University Press, 2002.
- What Philosophers Think - Continuum, 2003 (co-written with Stangroom, J. (eds.))
- Atheism: A Very Short Introduction - Oxford University Press, 2003. ISBN 978-0-19-280424-2
- Great Thinkers A-Z - Continuum, 2004 (co-written with Stangroom, J. (eds.))
- What’s It All about? Philosophy and the meaning of life - Granta, 2004.
- The Pig that Wants to be Eaten and 99 other thought experiments - Granta, 2005.
- Do You Think What You Think You Think? - Granta, 2006 (co-written with Stangroom, J.)
- Welcome to Everytown: a journey into the English mind - Granta, 2007.
- The Ethics Toolkit: A Compendium of Ethical Concepts and Methods, Blackwell, 2007 (co-written with Peter S. Fosl) ISBN 978-1-4051-3231-2
- The Duck That Won the Lottery: And 99 Other Bad Arguments (published in paperback in UK as Do They Think You're Stupid?) - Granta, 2008 ISBN 978-1-84708-083-7
- Complaint: From Minor Moans to Principled Protests - Profile Books, 2008. ISBN 978-1-84668-057-1
- Should You Judge This Book by Its Cover? - Granta, 2009
- Without God, is Everything Permitted? The 20 Big Questions in Ethics - Quercus,2014
- The Ego Trick: What Does It Mean To Be You? - Granta Books, 2011
- Really Really Big Questions about Faith - Kingfisher (children's book), 2011 ISBN 9780753431511
- Freedom Regained: The Possibility of Free Will - Granta Books, 2015
- The Edge of Reason: A Rational Skeptic in an Irrational World - Yale University Press, 2016 ISBN 978-0-30020-823-8
- A Short History of Truth - Quercus, 2017 ISBN 978-1-78648-888-6
- How The World Thinks: A Global History Of Philosophy - Granta, 2018 ISBN 978-1783782284
- How to Think Like a Philosopher - Granta. Reviewed in Times Literary Supplement, Issue No. 6261, March 31, 2023
- How the World Eats: A Global Food Philosophy - Pegasus Books, 2025 ISBN 978-1-6393-6819-8
