= Beyond the Hoax =

2008 book by Alan Sokal

Beyond the Hoax: Science, Philosophy, and Culture
- Cover of the first edition
- Author: Alan Sokal
- Language: English
- Subject: Philosophy of science
- Publisher: Oxford University Press
- Publication date: 2008
- Media type: Print (hardcover and paperback)
- Pages: 448
- ISBN: 0-19-923920-7
- OCLC: 181926017
- Dewey Decimal: 501 22
- LC Class: Q175 S6395 2008
- Preceded by: Fashionable Nonsense

Beyond the Hoax: Science, Philosophy, and Culture is a 2008 book by Alan Sokal detailing the history of the Sokal affair in which he submitted an article full of "nonsense" to a journal and was able to get it published.

== Reception ==
Robert Matthews writes in The Times that "Sokal's essays—and his hoax—achieve their purpose of reminding us all that, in the words of the Victorian mathematician-philosopher William Kingdon Clifford, 'It is wrong, always, everywhere and for any one, to believe anything upon insufficient evidence.'" But it also notes that Beyond the Hoax:

fails to reflect the fact that Sokal's concerns are now widely shared—and that progress is being made in addressing them, the emergence of evidence-based social policy being an obvious example. His critique would also gain more credibility from encompassing his own community: the failure of scientific institutions to address the abuse of statistical methods or promote systematic reviews is no less of a threat to progress than the ramblings of postmodernists or fundamentalists.

Michael Shermer praised the book as "an essential text" and summarized the argument, writing that:

There is progress in science, and some views really are superior to others, regardless of the color, gender, or country of origin of the scientist holding that view. Despite the fact that scientific data are "theory laden," science is truly different than art, music, religion, and other forms of human expression because it has a self-correcting mechanism built into it. If you don't catch the flaws in your theory, the slant in your bias, or the distortion in your preferences, someone else will, usually with great glee and in a public forum—for example, a competing journal! Scientists may be biased, but science itself, for all its flaws, is still the best system ever devised for understanding how the world works.

Physicist and historian of science Allan Franklin, for whom Sokal was "a hero" to "many [...] of us working in the history and philosophy of science in the mid-1990s", described the publication as "somewhat disappointing". He also noted that Sokal's book's "sticking point is the possible reconciliation of Sokal’s view of religion, which he regards a ‘‘massive delusion’’, having no evidential basis, with the ethical and moral values that religious believers espouse."

Cornell University solid-state physicist N. David Mermin wrote in the journal Nature that Sokal "has an admirable passion for clarity of thought, and is commendably opposed to those who would pass off nonsense as profundity" yet maintained that "Sokal's unwillingness to expand his frame of reference to accommodate legitimately different points of view undermines his effectiveness as a scourge of genuine rubbish." Mermin wrote that Sokal's book was itself similar to the literary theory that Sokal criticised. Sokal's book

begins with a reprint of the famous parody, accompanied by a rambling commentary that could itself be a parody of pedantic literary explication. [...] Hoax fans ought to enjoy it.

Mermin continued that,

In a preface, Sokal announces his “visceral distaste for books that have been confected by pasting together a collection of loosely connected, previously published essays”. His book, he explains, is different. These ten essays (seven previously published) “form, I believe, a coherent whole”. But virtually everyone who publishes a collection of essays believes they form a coherent whole. Sokal's obliviousness to this is an early indication of a complacency about his own views, and a lack of imagination about what others might be thinking, that undermines much of what follows.

Mermin states that "I would like to think that we are not only beyond Sokal's hoax, but beyond the science wars themselves. This book might be a small step backwards."

== See also ==
- Pseudoscience
- Cargo cult science
- Grievance studies affair
