= M. Norton Wise =

American historian of science (born 1940)

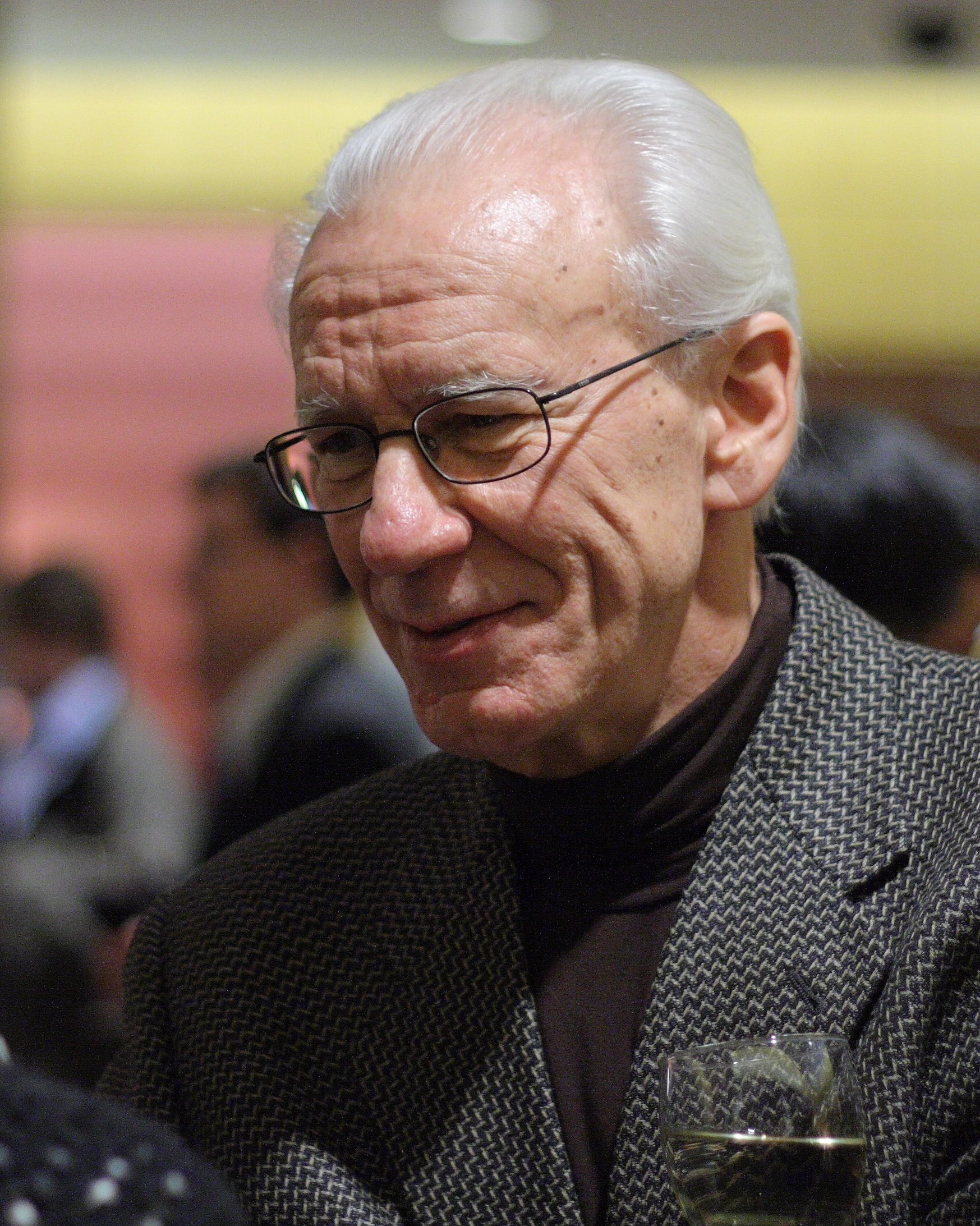
- Wise at the 2007 History of Science Society meeting
- Born: Matthew Norton Wise; April 2, 1940 (age 86); Tacoma, Washington, US
- Spouse: Elaine M. Liu (m. 1965)

Academic background
- Education: Pacific Lutheran University; Washington State University; Princeton University
- Thesis: Alpha-Alpha Coincidence Study of the Decay of the 17.28 MeV Level of ^{9}Be (1968); The Flow Analogy to Electricity and Magnetism (1977)

Academic work
- Discipline: History
- Sub-discipline: History of science
- Institutions: Auburn University; Oregon State University; University of California, Los Angeles; Princeton University
- Main interests: History of physics

Matthew Norton Wise (born 1940) is an American historian of science who is an emeritus professor at the University of California, Los Angeles (UCLA). He was also the co-director of the UCLA Center for Society and Genetics.

== Early life and education ==
Wise was born on April 2, 1940, in Tacoma, Washington. He earned a BSc in physics from Pacific Lutheran University in 1962 and went on to obtain two PhDs: a PhD in experimental nuclear physics from Washington State University in 1968, and a PhD in the history of science from Princeton University in 1977.

== Career ==
Wise was a physics professor at Auburn University and Oregon State University before becoming a history professor at UCLA and then, from 1991 to 2000, at Princeton, before returning to UCLA, where he remained until his retirement.

He famously attacked Gross and Levitt's book in which they perceive the obstruction of science by the academic left.

In 2004/5 he taught at Utrecht University and also spent much of his time at the Max Planck Institute in Berlin.

He is the recipient of the Berthold Leibinger Berlin Prize and was a Fellow at the American Academy in Berlin for Spring 2012.

He was awarded the George Sarton Medal in 2019.

Awards
Preceded by Lorraine Daston	Pfizer Award; 1990; With: Crosbie Smith	Succeeded by Adrian Desmond
Preceded by Sally Gregory Kohlstedt	George Sarton Medal; 2019	Succeeded by Jim Bennett
