= Nonscience =

Book by Brian J. Ford

- Author: Brian J. Ford
- Publication date: September 1971
- ISBN: 723404496

Nonscience is a 1971 book which claims to have the longest and most complex title in publishing history.

Its full title is Nonscience and the Pseudotransmogrificationalific Egocentrified Reorientational Proclivities Inherently Intracorporated In Expertistical Cerebrointellectualised Redeploymentation with Special Reference to Quasi-Notional Fashionistic Normativity, The Indoctrinationalistic Methodological Modalities and Scalar Socio-Economic Promulgationary Improvementalisationalism Predelineated Positotaxically Toward Individualistified Mass-Acceptance Gratificationalistic Securipermanentalisationary Professionism, or How To Rule The World, London: Wolfe Publishing (ISBN 0-7234-0449-6). The book was updated and reissued in 2020 as Nonscience Returns by the Curtis Press.

Its author Brian J. Ford pokes fun at those who conceal their lack of real expertise by using long and complicated words, whilst making the serious point that many people are fooled by these so-called experts. Some consider the book prescient, thinking that modern society, where decisions are taken by unseen experts, is much as Ford predicted.

== Spanish edition ==
In the Spanish edition the title was rendered as Como se falsifica la Ciencia; la Nonciencia y las proclividades Reorientacionales egocentrificadas pseudotransmigrificacionalificas inheremente intracorporadas a la Redesplegamentacion Expertistica Cerebrointelecualizada, con especial referencia a la Normatividad Modaistica Cuasi-nocional, las Modilidades Metodologicas adoctrinamientisticas y el Perfeccionamientalismo Escelar Socioeconomico Promulgacionario predelineado Postitotaxativaments Hacia el Profesionalismo Seguripermanentalinicario Gratificionalistico Individualistificado el la Aceptacion de las Masas, o Como Regir el Mundo [translation by Oscar Muslera], Libertad y Cambio, Buenos Aires: Granica Editor.

== Reviews ==
In Britain, the book was reviewed in the following publications:

- The Times Higher Education Supplement, October 22, 1971
- Atticus Column, Sunday Times, October 24, 1971
- Irish Press, October 30, 1971
- Time Out magazine, November 12, 1971.
- New Statesman, November 12, 1971.
- Nature: 234, December 3, 1971
- The Times Educational Supplement, December 3, 1971
- Times Literary Supplement, January 21, 1972
- Mensa Journal, January 22, 1972

The book was also featured on the BBC television show Tomorrow's World.

== See also ==
- Fashionable Nonsense: Postmodern Intellectuals' Abuse of Science
