= Emily Nussbaum =

American critic (born 1966)

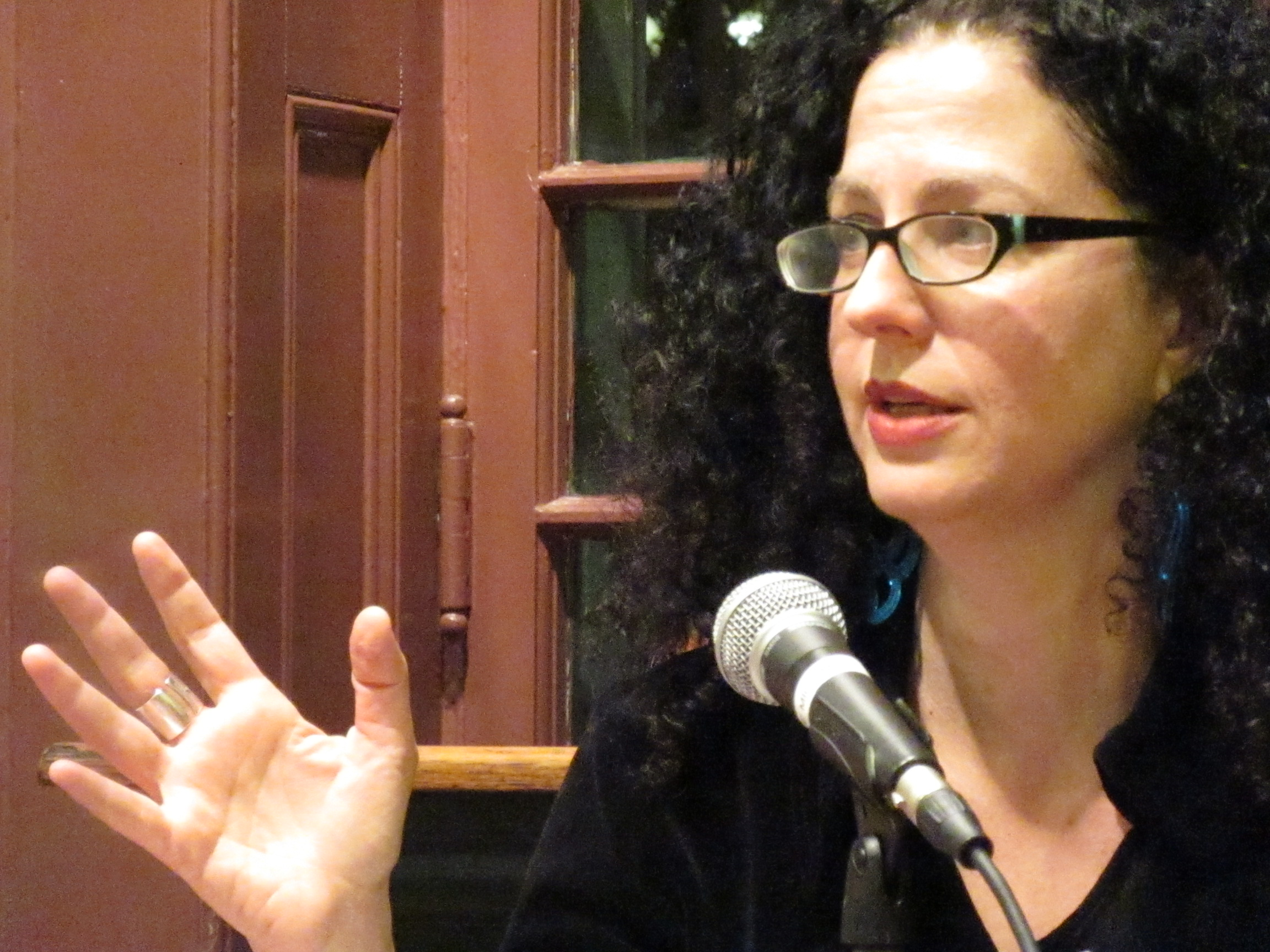
- Nussbaum in 2015
- Born: February 20, 1966 (age 60)
- Education: Oberlin College (BA); New York University (MA)
- Occupation: Critic
- Spouse: Clive Thompson
- Children: 2
- Relatives: Bernard Nussbaum (father)

Emily Nussbaum (born February 20, 1966) is an American critic and arts journalist. She is the theater critic for The New Yorker, where she was television critic from 2011 until 2019. In 2016, she won the Pulitzer Prize for Criticism.

== Early life ==
Nussbaum was born in the United States to mother Toby Nussbaum and Bernard Nussbaum, who served as White House Counsel to President Bill Clinton.

Nussbaum was raised in Scarsdale, New York, and graduated from Oberlin College in 1988. She earned a master's degree in poetry from New York University and started a doctoral program in literature, but decided not to pursue teaching.

== Career ==
After living in Providence, Rhode Island, and Atlanta, Georgia, Nussbaum began writing reviews of TV shows following her infatuation with the series Buffy the Vampire Slayer and posting at the website Television Without Pity. She began writing for Lingua Franca and served as editor-in-chief of Nerve. She also wrote for Slate and The New York Times.

Nussbaum then worked at New York magazine, where she was the creator of the "Approval Matrix" feature and wrote about culture and television. She was at New York for seven years and was the culture editor.

Since 2011, she has been a staff writer at The New Yorker, serving as the magazine's television critic from 2011 until 2019. She won a National Magazine Award for Columns and Commentary in 2014 and the Pulitzer Prize for Criticism in 2016. In 2025, she was named theater critic at The New Yorker.

== Personal life ==
Nussbaum is married to journalist Clive Thompson. They have two children. Nussbaum is Jewish.

== Awards ==
- 2014: National Magazine Awards, Columns and Commentary. Honors political and social commentary; news analysis; and reviews and criticism
- 2016: Pulitzer Prize for Criticism

== Bibliography ==
=== Books ===
- Nussbaum, Emily (June 25, 2019). I Like to Watch: Arguing My Way Through the TV Revolution. New York: Random House. ISBN 978-0-525-50896-0.
- Nussbaum, Emily (June 25, 2024). Cue the Sun!: The Invention of Reality TV. New York: Random House. ISBN 978-0-525-50899-1.
