= Norman Levitt =

American mathematician (1943–2009)

- Born: Norman Jay Levitt; August 27, 1943; The Bronx, New York City, U.S.
- Died: October 24, 2009 (aged 66)
- Education: Harvard College; Princeton University (PhD)
- Known for: Higher Superstition
- Scientific career
- Fields: Geometric topology
- Institutions: Rutgers University

Norman Jay Levitt (August 27, 1943 – October 24, 2009) was an American mathematician and writer. A specialist in topology and a professor at Rutgers University, he became better known to the general public for his criticism of postmodernist and social-constructivist descriptions of science.

== Education and career ==
Levitt was born in The Bronx and received a bachelor's degree from Harvard College in 1963. He received a PhD from Princeton University in 1967. His doctoral thesis was titled "Applications of engulfing", and his advisor was William Browder.

After two years at the Courant Institute of Mathematical Sciences, Levitt joined the mathematics faculty at Rutgers University in 1969 and remained there until his retirement in 2007.

== Work ==
Levitt's mathematical research included differential and geometric topology, as well as surgery theory. His 1989 monograph Grassmannians and Gauss Maps in Piecewise-Linear Topology developed analogs of Grassmannians and Gauss maps, with applications to characteristic class theory, smoothing theory, and immersion problems.

From the 1990s, Levitt became prominent as a critic of postmodernist, social-constructivist, and deconstructionist approaches to science. With biologist Paul R. Gross, he wrote Higher Superstition: The Academic Left and Its Quarrels with Science (1994), which criticized what they regarded as misunderstandings and politicization of science within parts of the academic humanities and social sciences.

Levitt's criticism focused particularly on what he regarded as anti-scientific tendencies within parts of the academic left. Although Levitt identified as left-wing, he argued that parts of the "academic left" had retreated into what he called "left scholasticism". He characterized this tendency as a belief that "solemn incantation can overturn the order of the social universe, if only the jargon be appropriately obscure and exotic, and intoned with sufficient fervor". In his obituary of Levitt, Michael Shermer summarized Levitt's objection as being directed at approaches that treated science as "just another way of knowing", thereby diminishing its epistemic status.

Higher Superstition influenced Alan Sokal's decision to submit a parody article to Social Text to test whether the journal would publish an article he considered nonsensical if it matched the editors' ideological expectations. Its publication and Sokal's later revelation of the hoax became known as the Sokal affair.

== Bibliography ==
- 1989 Grassmannians and Gauss Maps in Piecewise-Linear Topology
- 1994 Higher Superstition: The Academic Left and Its Quarrels with Science (with Paul R. Gross)
- 1997 The Flight from Science and Reason (co-edited with Paul R. Gross and Martin W. Lewis)
- 1999 Prometheus Bedeviled: Science and the Contradictions of Contemporary Culture
