= James Garvey (philosopher) =

American philosopher based in Britain (born 1967)

James Garvey (born 1967) is an American philosopher based in Britain.

== Career ==
Garvey is Managing Director of the Royal Institute of Philosophy, an educational charity supporting philosophy inside and outside the academy. He is editor of The Philosophers’ Magazine, a quarterly which aims to publish readable, accessible philosophy. With Jeremy Stangroom, he edits Think Now, a series of books on social and political philosophy. He is a regular and controversial contributor to The Guardian, commenting on morality and climate change, arguing that the developed nations have a moral obligation to take action. He has a PhD in Philosophy from University College London.

In The Ethics of Climate Change, Garvey summarises what moral philosophy does, examines the strength of the evidence for global warming, and analyses various possible policy responses. He argues that the line that taking drastic action to curb global warming would be bad for the economy amounts to “harming people for money”, and gives reasons for individual action on climate change.

He has a black belt (4th dan) in Jiu Jitsu and coaches the University College London Jiu Jitsu Club, leading it to a record 13 national championships.

== Selected publications ==
- The Great Philosophers, 2005 (With Jeremy Stangroom)
- Twenty Great Philosophy Books, 2006.
- The Ethics of Climate Change, 2008.
- The Continuum Companion to Philosophy of Mind, 2011.
- The Story of Philosophy: A History of Western Thought, 2012. (With Jeremy Stangroom)
- The Persuaders: The Hidden Industry that Wants to Change Your Mind, 2016.
