= Lingua Franca (magazine) =

American magazine

Linguafranca
- Categories: Literary magazine
- Founder: Jeffrey Kittay
- First issue: 1990
- Final issue: 2001
- Country: United States
- Language: English
- ISSN: 2162-0946

Lingua Franca was an American magazine about intellectual and literary life in academia.

== Founding ==
The magazine was founded in 1990 by Jeffrey Kittay, an editor and professor of French literature at Yale University. Kittay, as The New York Times reported, "saw a niche for vivid reporting about the academic world and especially about its many personal feuds and intellectual controversies." Kittay told the newspaper, "I was an academic who was very, very hungry for information about what made my profession so alive, where people became passionate about abstract ideas." Describing the magazine's impact years later, in the New York Observer, Ron Rosenbaum wrote that "It soon became a much-talked-about phenomenon inside and outside academia." In November, 2000, on the journal's tenth anniversary, the Village Voice commented that "Lingua Franca's influence on nineties magazine culture has been so strong, it's sometimes hard to remember that it was unique in academia when it began."

== Contents and contributors ==
In a 2002 retrospective article, Andrew Delbanco wrote about the magazine that "It ran stories about everything, from a historians' quarrel over the efficacy of the 1960s student movement, to a dispute among anthropologists over whether cannibalism ever existed, to the fight between the Harvard biologists E.O. Wilson and Richard Lewontin over the extent to which genes control human behavior, to the question of whether dissertation advisers should sleep with their students."

Contributors included editors and writers who went on to careers at The New Republic, Time, Slate, The New York Times Book Review, The Nation, The Economist, The London Review of Books, The Washington Post, and The New Yorker: Peter Beinart, Lev Grossman, Fred Kaplan, Robert S. Boynton, Warren St. John, Jonathan Mahler, Jennifer Schuessler, Matthew Steinglass, Daniel Mendelsohn, Laura Secor, Hillary Frey, Lawrence Osborne, Caleb Crain, Rachel Donadio, Jeet Heer, Corey Robin, Chris Mooney, James Ryerson, Emily Nussbaum, Clive Thompson, Jesse Sheidlower, and Adam Shatz. As cultural critic Ron Rosenbaum wrote in The New York Observer, "The kind of writing about ideas that once found a home at Lingua Franca has since — with the assistance of many talented Lingua Franca alumni, both writers and editors — succeeded in changing the face of serious journalism for the better."

== Editors ==
Jeffrey Kittay served as the magazine's editor-in-chief. For its first year, the editor was Peter Edidin. From 1991 to 1994, Lingua Franca was co-edited by Judith Shulevitz and Margaret Talbot. In late 1994, Alexander Star became the editor, joined by Emily Eakin. The New York Times critic A.O. Scott served as a senior editor, as did New Yorker features editor Daniel Zalewski. Historian and journalist Rick Perlstein, the author of Nixonland, began his journalism career as an intern there, later becoming associate editor.

== Sokal Affair ==
Lingua Franca was where the Sokal Affair — a parody of academic practices and post-structuralist language — was first revealed; Lingua Franca editors later produced a book of selected papers on the subject, The Sokal Hoax, published by the University of Nebraska Press.

== Final issue ==
The magazine halted publication during the 2001 economic downturn, after a financial backer withdrew support. New Yorker editor David Remnick told The New York Times, "That is terrible. I really enjoyed it — I always found something fascinating to read in that magazine, and not infrequently something that I wish we had had for The New Yorker." The company behind the magazine declared bankruptcy in April 2002. Later in 2002, editor Alexander Star assembled an anthology: Quick Studies: The Best of Lingua Franca, published by Farrar Straus Giroux.

In 2006, at age 19, Aaron Swartz wrote a program to put up a mirror archive of the magazine on the web.

== Honors ==
Lingua Franca received the National Magazine Award for General Excellence (under 100,000 circulation) in 1993. The magazine was nominated again in 1994, 1996, 1998, and 1999.

== See also ==
- Sokal Affair
- Arts & Letters Daily
