= James Garvey (hurler) =

Irish hurler

James Michael "Staff" Garvey (13 December 1899 – October 1987) was an Irish hurler who played club hurling with Cappataggle. He was a member of the Galway team that won the 1923 All-Ireland Championship.
