= Bruce Fink (psychoanalyst) =

American psychoanalyst, translator, and writer

- Citizenship: American
- Education: Cornell University; University of Paris VIII (Saint-Denis)
- Occupations: psychoanalyst, former professor and author
- Writing career
- Notable works: A Clinical Introduction to Lacanian Psychoanalysis: Theory and Technique, The Lacanian Subject
- Website: brucefink.com

Bruce Fink is an American Lacanian psychoanalyst and a major translator of Jacques Lacan. He is the author of numerous books on Lacan and Lacanian psychoanalysis, prominent among which are Lacan to the Letter: Reading Écrits Closely, The Lacanian Subject: Between Language and Jouissance (1995), Lacan on Love: An Exploration of Lacan's Seminar VIII and A Clinical Introduction to Lacanian Psychoanalysis: Theory and Technique.

== Education and work ==
After completing a college scholar program, and graduating from Cornell University in 1976, Fink completed his graduate work abroad at the University of Paris, VIII. Among Fink's mentors at Paris VIII was the preeminent philosopher Alain Badiou, who supervised his M.A. thesis in philosophy. Fink completed his Ph.D. in psychoanalysis in 1987, defending a dissertation on the work of Lacan. After graduating Fink was admitted to the psychoanalytic formation program of the École de la Cause freudienne, an institute of the French Psychoanalytic Institute. While a student at Paris VIII Fink attended "Orientation lacanienne" seminar given by Jacques-Alain Miller, the foremost interpreter of Lacan and at the time the head of Ecole de la Cause Freudienne (School of Freudian Cause).

Fink is the author of several books and dozens of peer-reviewed articles on Lacan and Lacanian clinical methods, and is one of the most widely read Lacanian analysts in the English-speaking world. His translation of Lacan's Écrits is considered the standard edition. In addition to translating several of Lacan's later seminars, since 1986 he has presented his theoretical and clinical work at nearly a hundred different conferences, psychoanalytic institutes, and universities in the U.S. and abroad.

== Bibliography ==
Authored (English)

- A Clinical Introduction to Freud: Techniques for Everyday Practice (W. W. Norton, 2017).
- Lacan on Love: An Exploration of Lacan's Seminar VIII, Transference (Routledge, 2016).
- The Purloined Love: An Inspector Canal Mystery (Karnac Books, 2014).
- Odor di Murderer, Scent of a Killer: An Adventure from Inspector Canal's New York Agency (Karnac Books, 2014).
- Against Understanding, Volume 1: Commentary and Critique in a Lacanian Key (Routledge, 2014).
- Against Understanding, Volume 2: Cases and Commentary in a Lacanian Key (Routledge, 2014).
- Death by Analysis: Another Adventure from Inspector Canal’s New York Agency (Karnac Books, 2013).
- The Psychoanalytic Adventures of Inspector Canal (Karnac Books, 2010).
- Fundamentals of Psychoanalytic Technique: A Lacanian Approach for Practitioners (New York: W.W. Norton, 2007).
- Lacan To The Letter: Reading Ecrits Closely (Saint Paul: University of Minnesota Press, 2004).
- A Clinical Introduction to Lacanian Psychoanalysis: Theory and Technique (Cambridge: Harvard University Press, 1997).
- The Lacanian Subject: Between Language and Jouissance (Princeton: Princeton University Press, 1995).

Edited collections:

- Reading Seminar XX: Lacan's Major Work on Love, Knowledge, and Feminine Sexuality, eds. Bruce Fink, Richard Feldstein, and Maire Jaanus. Albany: SUNY Press, 2002
- Reading Seminars I and II: Lacan's Return to Freud, eds. Bruce Fink, Richard Feldstein, and Maire Jaanus. Albany: SUNY Press, 1996
- Reading Seminar XI: Lacan's Four Fundamental Concepts of Psychoanalysis with the first English translation of "Position of the Unconscious", eds. Bruce Fink and Suzanne Barnard. Albany: SUNY Press, 1995

Articles:

- La médicalisation de la psychologie américaine, L'âne. Le magazine freudien 29, 1986
- Critique de "Jewish Origins of the Psychoanalytic Movement", Ornicar? 41, 1987
- Critique de "Reading Lacan", Ornicar? 41
- Qu'est-ce que la séduction?, L'âne. Le magazine freudien 31
- Notes on Temporal Tension, Newsletter of the Freudian Field 2, 1988
- The Seminar of Jacques Lacan: A Critical Review, Literature and Psychology 36, 1990
- Alienation and Separation: Logical Moments of Lacan's Dialectic of Desire, Newsletter of the Freudian Field 4
- There's No Such Thing as a Sexual Relationship: Existence and the Formulas of Sexuation, Newsletter of the Freudian Field 5, 1991
- The Lacanian Subject, Analysis 3
- The Subject as Metaphor, Newsletter of the Freudian Field 5
- "Ni spolnega razmerja." Eksistenca in formule seksuacije, translation into Slovenian of Bruce Fink's work on feminine sexuality. in Filozofija skoz Psihoanalizo VII. collection edited by Slavoj Zizek, Ljubljana, Analecta, p. 225-59, 1993
- Tommy, the Anatomy of a Trauma, Lacanian Ink 10, 1995
- The Real Cause of Repetition, a chapter in Reading Seminar XI: Lacan's Four Fundamental Concepts of Psychoanalysis, eds. Bruce Fink, Richard Feldstein, and Maire Jaanus. Albany: SUNY Press, p. 223-9
- Science and Psychoanalysis, a chapter in Reading Seminar XI: Lacan's Four Fundamental Concepts of Psychoanalysis, eds. Bruce Fink, Richard Feldstein, and Maire Jaanus. Albany: SUNY Press, p. 55-64
- Alain Badiou, UMBR(a) 1, 1996
- Reading Hamlet with Lacan, Lacan, Politics, Aesthetics, eds. Richard Feldstein and Willy Apollon. Albany: SUNY Press, p. 181-98
- The Analytic Relationship, Looking at Lacan, eds. Kareen Malone and Stephen Friedlander. Albany: SUNY Press, 1999
- Knowledge and Science: Fantasies of the Whole, Lacan and Science, eds. Jason Glynos and Yannis Stavrakakis. London: Rebus Press
- The Ethics of Psychoanalysis, The Psychoanalytic Review 86, 4; 529-45
- The Four Discourses, Key Concepts of Lacanian Psychoanalysis, ed. Danny Nobus, London: Rebus Press
- Psychoanalytic Approaches to Severe Pathology: A Lacanian Perspective, Newsletter of the International Federation for Psychoanalytic education, 2001
- Interview of Bruce Fink by Miles Smit, Leuven Philosophy Newsletter vol. XI, 2003
- Interview of Bruce Fink by Dan Warner, Journal of Lacanian Studies vol. XI
- The Use of Lacanian Psychoanalysis in a case of Fetishism, Clinical Case Studies II 1
- Lacan in Translation, Journal for Lacanian Studies 3, 2004
- Lacanian Clinical Practice, The Psychoanalytical Review vol. 92, 4, 2005
- Freud and Lacan on Love: A Preliminary Exploration, Acta Philosophica-Filozofski vestnik Ljubljana, Slovenian Institute of Philosophy, 2006
- Lacan on Personality from the 1930s to the 1950s, Journal of European Psychoanalysis 26/27, 2008
- Lacan'in Temel Frntazi Kavramina Bir Giris, MonoKL, 2009
- Bruce Fink ile Soylesi, MonoKL
- Against Understanding: Why Understanding Should Not Be Viewed as an Essential Aim of Psychanalytic Treatment, Journal of the American Psychoanalytic Association 58/2, 2010
- Analysand and Analyst in the Global Economy, New Formations, 2011
- What's So Different about Lacan's Approach to Psychoanalysis, The Psychoanalytical Review
- Love and the Real, Sexual Identity and the Unconscious, Comments on Rolf Flor's Case Presentation, Lacan and Addiction: An Anthology

Translations:

- Jacques Lacan: Logical Time and the Assertion of Anticipated Certainty, Newsletter of the Freudian Field 2, 1988
- Alain Badiou: On a Finally Objectless Subject, Topoi 7. ed. Jean-Luc Nancy, Kluwer Academic Publishers, 1988
- Jacques Lacan: Science and Truth, Newsletter of the Freudian Field 3, 1989
- Jacques-Alain Miller. Microscopia: An Introduction to the Reading of Television, Television: A Challenge to the Psychoanalytic Establishment. New York: W.W. Norton & Co., 1990
- Jacques Lacan: Metaphor of the Subject, Newsletter of the Freudian Field 5, 1991
- Jacques Lacan: The Seminar, Book XX, Encore, On Feminine Sexuality: The Limits of Love and Knowledge (1972-1973), New York: W.W. Norton, 1998
- Écrits: A Selection by Jacques Lacan, New York: W.W. Norton, 2002
- Écrits: The First Complete Edition in English by Jacques Lacan, New York: W.W. Norton, 2006
- Jacques Lacan: The Triumph of Religion, Cambridge: Polity, 2013
- Jacques Lacan: The Names-of-the-Father, Cambridge: Polity
- Jacques Lacan: The Seminar, Book VIII, Transference, Cambridge: Polity, 2015
- Colette Soler: Lacanian Affects: The Function of Affect in Lacan's Work, London: Routledge
