= Bruce Robbins (academic) =

American literary scholar (born 1949)

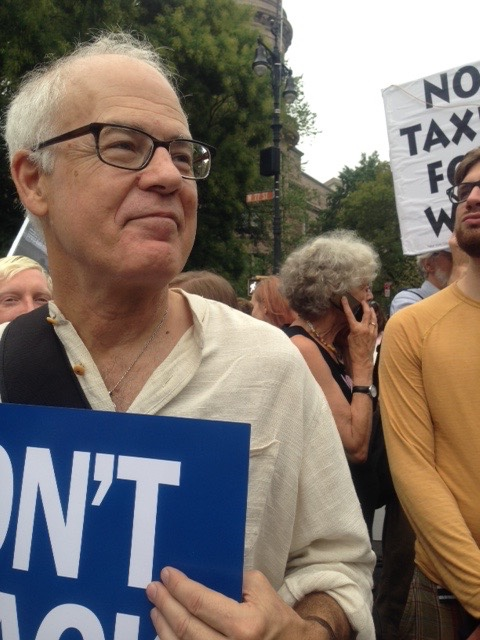
- Born: 1949 (age 76–77); Brooklyn, NY
- Occupations: Literary scholar, author and academic
- Title: Old Dominion Foundation Professor in the Humanities
- Awards: Guggenheim Foundation Fellowship

Academic background
- Education: B.A., History and Literature; M.A., English and American Literature and Language; Ph.D., English and American Literature and Language
- Alma mater: Harvard College; Harvard University

Bruce Robbins is an American literary scholar, author and an academic. He is the Old Dominion Foundation Professor in the Humanities in the Department of English and Comparative Literature at Columbia University.

Robbins's research interests include book projects on the history of literary representations of atrocity and the connections between criticism and politics, along with cosmopolitanism, intellectuals, nineteenth and twentieth century fiction, and literary and cultural theory. He has authored several books including The Servant's Hand: English Fiction from Below, Feeling Global: Internationalism in Distress, and The Beneficiary. He has also directed two documentaries, Some of My Best Friends Are Zionists and What Kind of Jew Is Shlomo Sand?.

Robbins worked as co-editor of the journal Social Text from 1991 until 2000 and is editor-in-chief of the online journal politicsslashletters.org.

== Education ==
Robbins graduated in History and Literature from Harvard College in 1971. He received his M.A. and Ph.D. degrees in English and American Literature and Language from Harvard University in 1976 and 1980, respectively.

== Career ==
Robbins started as an assistant of Modern English Literature at University of Geneva and then taught at University of Lausanne from 1981 until 1984 as a maître-assistant in American Literature. In 1984, he joined Rutgers University as an Assistant Professor and was promoted to Associate Professor and to Professor in 1987 and 1992, respectively. He was promoted to Professor II in 2000. In 2001, Robbins joined the Department of English and Comparative Literature at Columbia University.

== Research ==
Robbins's research centers on cosmopolitanism, intellectuals, the state, the public sphere, and fiction since the nineteenth century, along with political theory, Marxism, and critical social theory. His recent work includes book projects on the history of literary representations of atrocity and the connections between criticism and politics.

=== The Servant’s Hand: English Fiction from Below ===
Robbins published his first book, The Servant’s Hand: English Fiction from Below in 1986. The book discusses regarding the presence of servants in the margins of novels that are not written for or about them. A review by Keith Embley stated that "The Servant's Hand attempts to extract the political sub-text of its chosen literary material". Gerald C. Sorensen described the book as a "narrative that offers us a way of seeing", and that "in these margins of the nineteenth century realist novel something of importance is inscribed".

The book was also reviewed as "a provocative and stimulating work and an exciting addition to this field of scholarly endeavor", and as "a work of innovative literary and cultural history".

=== Secular Vocations: Intellectuals, Professionalism, Culture ===
Robbins published his second book, Secular Vocations: Intellectuals, Professionalism, Culture in 1993. The book makes a case in favor of professionalism, which was not a popular argument in the midst of the Culture Wars of the 1990s. According to Publishers Weekly, Robbins "offers an original defense of academic cultural criticism as practiced today" and contended that "university-based intellectuals can contribute valuable critical insight and political awareness to a likewise professionalized public".

Although Robbins had been co-editor of the journal Social Text in 1996, when it was hoaxed by the physicist Alan Sokal, Robbins collaborated with Sokal in 2002 on a project titled An Open Letter of American Jews to our Government, which protested American support for Israel. The Open Letter was published in The New York Times.

Robbins's involvement with the Israeli and Palestinian politics has also resulted in two documentary films. "Some of My Best Friends Are Zionists" was released in 2012, and "What Kind of Jew Is Shlomo Sand?" was released in 2020.

=== Upward Mobility and the Common Good ===
Robbins' book, Upward Mobility and the Common Good brings the state into the subject of literature and class. The book was reviewed as "an important and committed study" and a "highly readable and enlightening book". According to Ina Habermann, "The author's ambivalence about his own argument makes it, if anything, more compelling".

A review by John Brenkman stated that "Robbins's argument is not only unpersuasive but also implausible", and that "there is considerable ambivalence and conceptual uncertainty in Robbins's perspective on the welfare state".

=== The Beneficiary ===
Robbins has also focused on the subjects of internationalism and cosmopolitanism. This work has resulted in a trilogy of books including Feeling Global: Internationalism in Distress, Perpetual War: Cosmopolitanism from the Viewpoint of Violence, and The Beneficiary. The latter was published in 2020 and was reviewed as succeeding "brilliantly in focusing its readers on the urgencies of our time". One review states that "Robbins uncovers a hidden tradition of economic cosmopolitanism".

According to Christina Lupton, "in The Beneficiary, Bruce Robbins wants to make room for the note of guilt in our songs of gratitude. Who is a beneficiary? Robbins's answer is that it is probably you". She also stated that "if Robbins has his way, we'll not only still be thinking globally – we'll live in a world that makes doing so tolerable."

== Awards and honors ==
- 1971 – Edward Chandler Cumming Prize, Harvard University
- 1985 – Rutgers Research Council Summer Fellowship, Rutgers University
- 1986-1987 – Fellowship for Independent Study, National Endowment for the Humanities
- 1992-1993 – Fellowship, Center for the Critical Analysis of Contemporary Culture, Rutgers University
- 1995 – Fellowship, Society for the Humanities, Cornell University
- 1997-1998 – Board of Trustees Award for Excellence in Research, Rutgers University
- 2006 – Mellon Distinguished Visiting Professor, University of Illinois
- 2011-2012 – Guggenheim Foundation Fellowship

== Bibliography ==
=== Selected books ===
- The Servant's Hand: English Fiction from Below (1993) ISBN 978-0822313977
- Secular Vocations: Intellectuals, Professionalism, Culture (1993) ISBN 978-0860914303
- Feeling Global: Internationalism in Distress (1999) ISBN 978-0814775141
- Upward Mobility and the Common Good: Toward a Literary History of the Welfare State (2007) ISBN 978-0691049878
- Perpetual War: Cosmopolitanism from the Viewpoint of Violence (2012) ISBN 978-0822352099
- The Beneficiary (2017) ISBN 978-0822370215
- Criticism and Politics: A Polemical Introduction (2022) ISBN 978-1503630192
- Atrocity: A Literary History (2025) ISBN 978-1503640559

=== Selected articles and essays ===
- Robbins, B. (1998). Actually existing cosmopolitanism. Cosmopolitics: Thinking and feeling beyond the nation, 1-19.
- Robbins, B. (2007, July). Cruelty is Bad: Banality and Proximity in" Never Let Me Go". In Novel: A Forum on Fiction (Vol. 40, No. 3, pp. 289–302). Duke University Press.
- Robbins, B. (2002). The sweatshop sublime. PMLA, 117(1), 84–97.
- Rubenstein, M., Robbins, B., & Beal, S. (2015). Infrastructuralism: An Introduction. MFS Modern Fiction Studies, 61(4), 575–586.
- Robbins, B. (1994). Secularism, Elitism, Progress, and Other Transgressions: On Edward Said's" Voyage in". Social Text, (40), 25–37.
- Robbins, B., "The Politics of Doikayt: The Bund and the history of Jewish anti-Zionism" (review of Molly Crabapple, Here Where We Live Is Our Country: The Story of the Jewish Bund, One World, 2026, 480 pp.), The Nation, vol. 323, no. 3 (October 2026), pp. 84–86, 88. "[T]he Bund wanted to stay [in Poland] and fight — for Jewish and working-class emancipation through socialism — where its members lived. In the Bund's eyes, the Zionists wanted exactly what the antisemites around them wanted: for the Jews: to self-deport. [T]he Bundists ... predict[ed], early and accurately, what the Zionist project of colonizing Palestine would mean for the Palestinians."
