= Paul R. Gross =

American biologist and author

Paul R. Gross is an American biologist and author, perhaps best known to the general public for Higher Superstition (1994), written with Norman Levitt. Gross is the University Professor of Life Sciences (Emeritus) at the University of Virginia; he previously served the university as Provost and vice-president. He has written widely on the intellectual conflicts of the science wars, biology, evolution, and creationism—for example, his book Creationism's Trojan Horse: The Wedge of Intelligent Design (2004), written with Barbara Forrest.

Gross earned his A.B. in zoology and his Ph.D. in general physiology from the University of Pennsylvania. He has taught at the Massachusetts Institute of Technology, New York University, Brown University, and the University of Rochester. From 1978 to 1988, he was Director and President of the Marine Biological Laboratory at Woods Hole, Massachusetts.

== Bibliography ==
- (with Norman Levitt) Higher Superstition: The Academic Left and Its Quarrels With Science. (Baltimore: Johns Hopkins University Press, 1994). ISBN 0-8018-5707-4
- Politicizing Science Education, Thomas B. Fordham Foundation, April 2000.
- "Berlinski Vanquishes Pseudoscience—Again," Commentary, December 16, 2002.
- "Intelligent Design and That Vast Right-Wing Conspiracy," Science Insights, September 2003.
- Creationism's Trojan Horse. Oxford University Press, 2004. ISBN 0-19-515742-7
- "Neo-creationist Tactics Show troubling Evolution," Science & Theology News, October 14, 2005.
- "Science Standards: We Can't afford to Go Light," National Review Online, November 16, 2005.
