= The Philosophers' Magazine =

- Discipline: Philosophy
- Language: English
- Edited by: James Garvey, Jeremy Stangroom

Publication details
- History: 1997–2023
- Publisher: Apeiron Ltd. (United Kingdom)
- Frequency: Quarterly

Standard abbreviations
- ISO 4: Philos. Mag. (Lond.)

Indexing
- ISSN: 1354-814X (print); 2048-4674 (web)
- LCCN: sn9844645
- OCLC no.: 40592221

Links
- Journal homepage

The Philosophers' Magazine (TPM) is an independent magazine focussed on philosophy.

The print version of the TPM was founded in 1997, aiming to provide a venue for philosophy in an accessible and entertaining format. The founders were Julian Baggini and Jeremy Stangroom. The magazine included articles, book reviews, interviews, and other content. TPM was edited by James Garvey, while Jeremy Stangroom edited its sister website, TPM Online. The magazine was distributed in the US and Canada by the Philosophy Documentation Center.

It ceased publication in its print form with issue 99 in 2023, but continues as an online-only magazine edited by Daniel Kodsi, with Eric Sheng acting as the deputy editor.

== See also ==
- List of philosophy journals
