= Social Text =

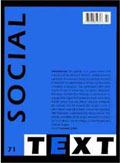
- Discipline: Cultural studies
- Language: English
- Edited by: Jonathan Beller, Amber Musser

Publication details
- History: Since 1979
- Publisher: Duke University Press (United States)
- Frequency: Quarterly

Standard abbreviations
- ISO 4: Soc. Text

Indexing
- ISSN: 0164-2472 (print); 1527-1951 (web)
- LCCN: 79644624
- JSTOR: 01642472
- OCLC no.: 423561805

Links
- Journal homepage; Online access; Online archive

Social Text is a peer-reviewed academic journal published by Duke University Press. The journal has addressed a wide range of social and cultural phenomena, covering questions of gender, sexuality, race, and the environment. Journal issues address debates across postcolonialism, postmodernism, and popular culture. Started in 1979 by an independent group of academics, the journal was self-published until its adoption by Duke University Press in 1992.

The journal gained notoriety in 1996 for the Sokal affair, when it published a nonsensical article that physicist Alan Sokal had deliberately written as a hoax. In its response to the hoax, the editorial board, then consisting of Bruce Robbins and Andrew Ross, claimed to have understood the article as a good faith attempt by Sokal to develop a social theory of his field, and published it to encourage him in this effort. The board also suggested to Sokal he revise and resubmit his article, which Sokal declined to do. The editors eventually decided to publish the article as part of an issue on science studies.

The editors of the journal were awarded the 1996 Ig Nobel Prize in Literature for "eagerly publishing research that they could not understand, that the author said was meaningless, and which claimed that reality does not exist". The journal did not practice academic peer review, and it did not submit the article for outside expert review by a physicist. The Sokal article has not been retracted by the journal.

== See also ==
- List of Ig Nobel Prize winners
- Science wars
