= Jean Bricmont =

Belgian physicist and essayist (born 1952)

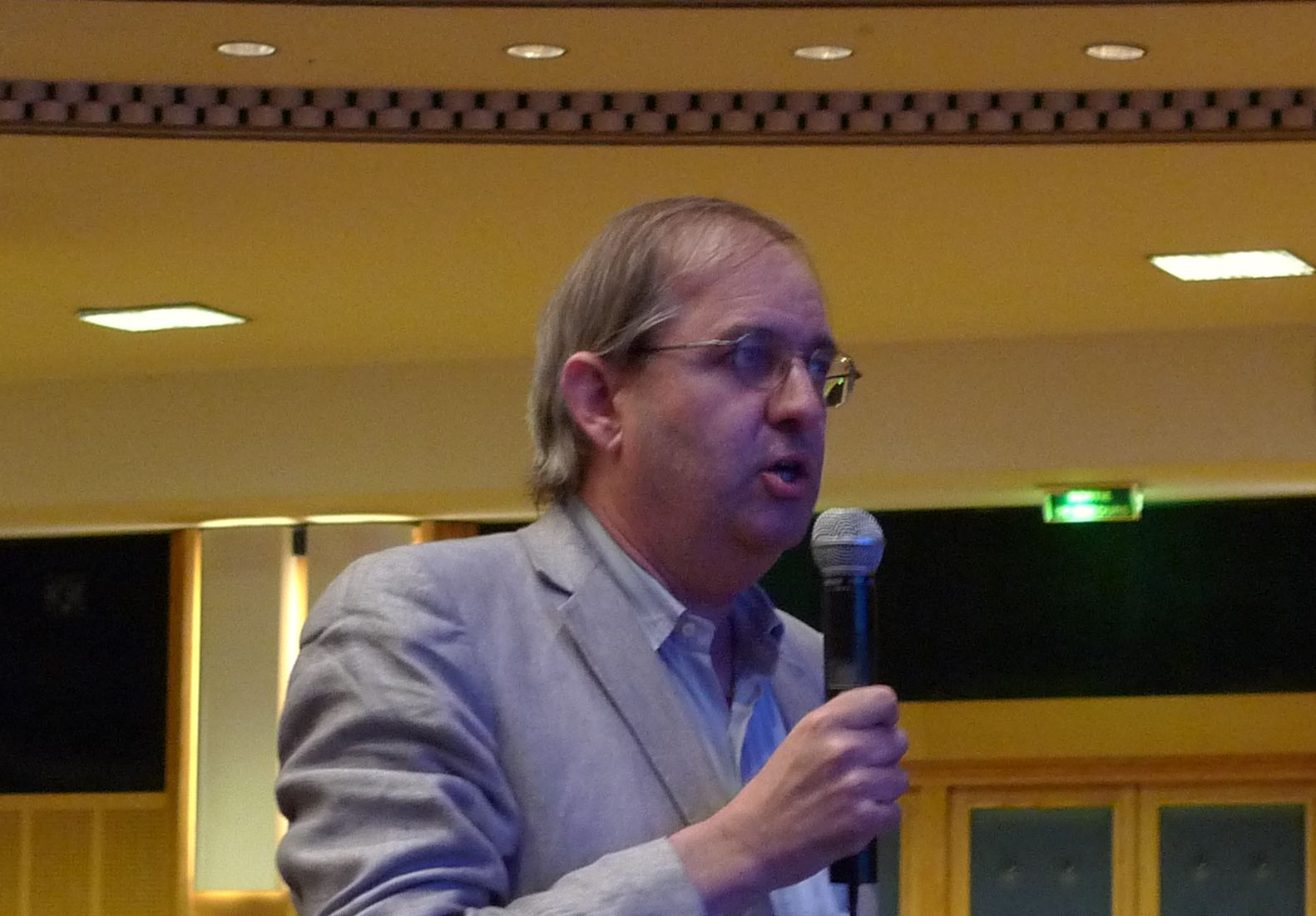
- Jean Bricmont (2010)
- Born: 12 April 1952 (age 74); Uccle, Belgium
- Citizenship: Belgium
- Scientific career
- Fields: Physics, Philosophy of Science
- Workplaces: UCLouvain; Rutgers University; Princeton University

Jean Bricmont (French: [bʁikmɔ̃]; born 12 April 1952) is a Belgian theoretical physicist and philosopher of science. Professor at the Catholic University of Louvain (UCLouvain), he works on renormalization group and nonlinear differential equations. Since 2004, Bricmont is a member of the Division of Sciences of the Royal Academy of Belgium.

Bricmont describes himself as a rationalist. He has criticized postmodernist views of science along with Alan Sokal, with whom he wrote Fashionable Nonsense (1997). He has also criticized imperialism and defended freedom of expression, adopting a position on the issue similar to that of Noam Chomsky.

Jean Bricmont was president of the Association française pour l'information scientifique from 2001 to 2006.

== Books ==
- Impérialisme humanitaire (2005) published in English as Humanitarian Imperialism, 2006 LCCN 2006-34221 ISBN 1-58367-147-1
- Preface to L'Atlas alternatif – Frédéric Delorca (ed), Pantin, Temps des Cerises, 2006
- Raison contre pouvoir. Le Pari de Pascal Jean Bricmont and Noam Chomsky, 5 November 2009
- La République des censeurs, L'Herne. 2014. ISBN 978-2851974570.
- Bricmont, Jean (2016). Making Sense of Quantum Mechanics. Springer. ISBN 978-3319258898. LCCN 2019757770.
- Bricmont, Jean (2017). Quantum Sense and Nonsense. Springer. ISBN 978-3319652719. LCCN 2019744992.
