= Historiography of science =

History and analysis of the history of science

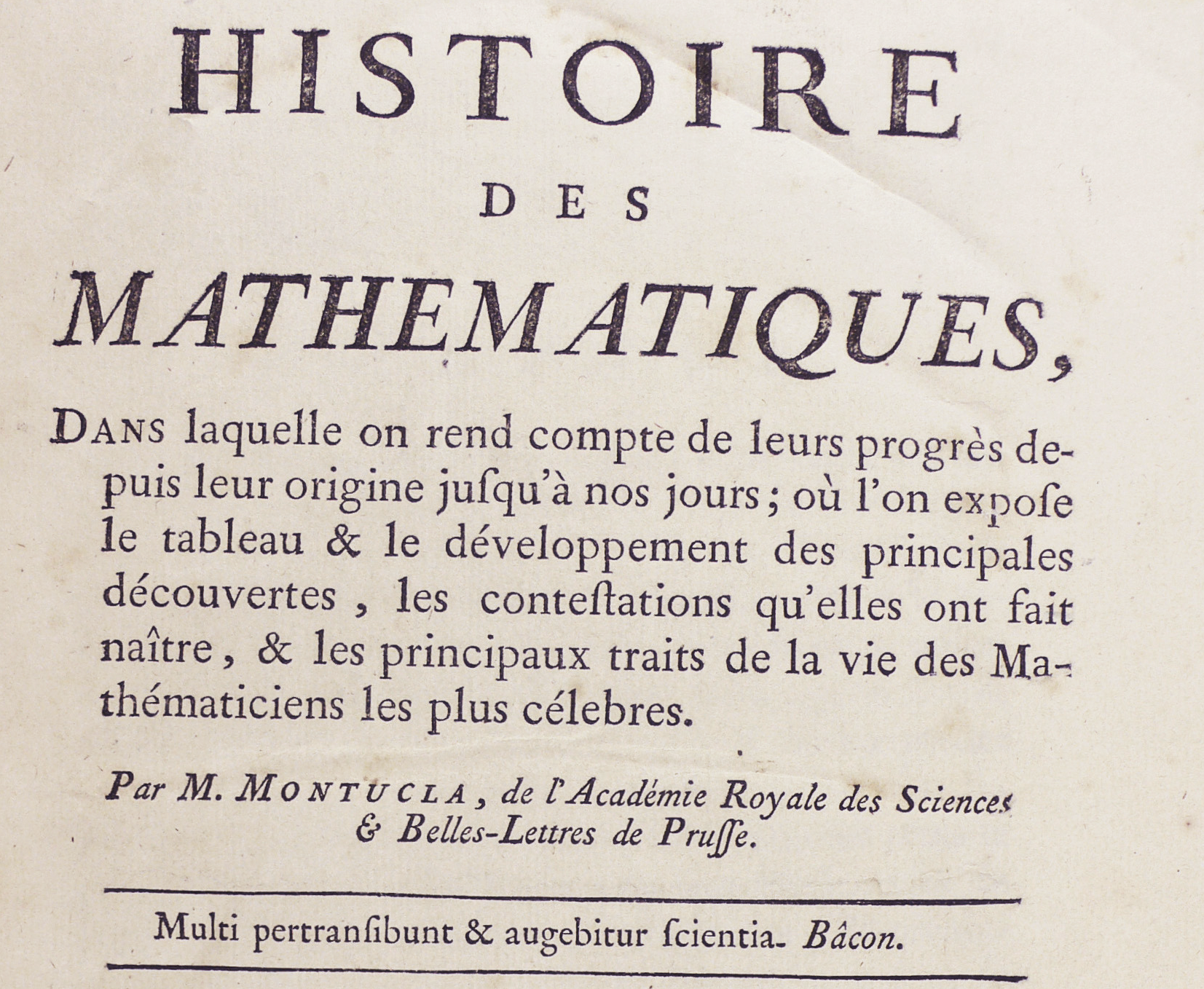
Histoire Des Mathématiques (1758) by Jean-Étienne Montucla: "In which an account is given of its progress from its origin until our own day; wherein is set forth the overview and the development of the principal discoveries, the disputes to which they have given rise, and the principal traits of the lives of the most famous Mathematicians." "Many shall pass through and knowledge shall be increased." - Bacon

Historiography of science is the history and analysis of the sub-discipline of history known as the history of science, including its disciplinary aspects and practices (methods, theories, schools), and controversies. Its subject is the variety of ways that science's past has been written about.

The earliest histories of science were written by scientists largely as celebrations of scientific progress. Scholars in the 19th and early 20th century frequently treated the history and philosophy of science as a single scholarly undertaking but the fields began to diverge under the influence of logical positivism, which demarcated scientific justification as the proper concern of philosophy, leaving scientific discovery to the historians.

The increasing professionalization of science history (i.e. the emergence of "history of science" as an independent field) in the 20th century and the entry of sociologists into the field caused friction with scientists and "practitioner" historians (practicing or retired scientists writing about their own fields). The divide has often centered on a disagreement over whether the history of science should be an accounting of scientific progress or a critical analysis of science as a cultural activity. That disagreement reached a climax during the "science wars" of the 1990s when prominent scientists criticized sociologists and some historians for ignoring the objective reality of nature in favor of political explanations when writing science history.

Since the history of science requires a difficult intellectual "bilingualism" that straddles science and history, the polarization of the surrounding culture between the sciences and the humanities in the 20th century remains an inherent, and ongoing, challenge for the field. Some science historians have acknowledged the reality of the divide but also argued that it can be bridged by scholars who are trained as both scientists and historians.

== Scientists ==
=== Narratives of progress ===
Internalism and externalism

Internalism in the history of science is the claim, or view, that science develops due to its own internal and intellectualist logic that is independent of social influences. Internalist histories of science often focus on the rational reconstruction of scientific ideas - a "progressive succession of disembodied ideas" - and consider the development of these ideas wholly within the scientific world.

Externalism, in contrast, is the claim, or view, that science is a product of broader social forces. Externalist histories of science have a sociological, instead of philosophical, logic.

General historians have, historically, been inclined to leave the history of science to specialists. The first histories of science, in the 18th century, were instead written by Enlightenment-era scientists like Jean-Étienne Montucla (1725-1799),, Jean Le Rond d'Alembert (1717-1783) and Joseph Priestley (1733-1804) who generally saw history as a pedagogic tool for celebrating the progress of human reason and/or as a narrative of a linear and progressive march toward the superior knowledge of the present. In the 19th century, popular biographies of scientists helped to amplify Newton's reputation as both a scientific genius and national hero in Great Britain and scientist-historian John William Draper advanced an influential conflict thesis between religion and science. By the mid-20th century, however, historians specializing in the history of science began to disparage these earlier efforts. In particular, they criticized "practitioner" (i.e. scientist) historians for systematically neglecting primary sources, failing to truly understand those sources when they didn't neglect them, being oblivious to the social (i.e. "external") context of science and favoring hagiographic stories of scientist-heroes and their myopic, misguided and/or prejudiced adversaries.

=== Science wars ===
While most scientists writing history of science have tended to favor an internalist approach that traced the rational and logical evolution of scientific ideas, the Soviet physicist Boris Hessen (1893-1936) was a notable exception, arguing that even Newton’s physics was a direct product of the economic needs of 17th-century British capitalism. Hessen’s externalist approach gained momentum over the following decades as sociologists entered the field, but it also eventually sparked a backlash from scientists and philosophers in the 1990s who fiercely criticized sociologists and externalist historians for ignoring the objective reality of nature and for their position that the history of science should be written without regard for whether the theories involved were actually correct. The "frenzied confrontations" of this conflict - later known as the science wars - were escalated by the book Higher Superstition: The Academic Left and Its Quarrels With Science by the biologist Paul R. Gross and the mathematician Norman Levitt. The term itself was coined for a special 1996 issue of Social Text, a Duke University Press publication of postmodern critical theory, that featured multiple articles emphasizing the social construction of science. The dispute gained significant media interest because of the Sokal hoax, which generated unusually wide public interest and transformed what had been a specialized academic debate about how science develops into a broader public controversy.

== Philosophers ==
=== Methods and justifications ===
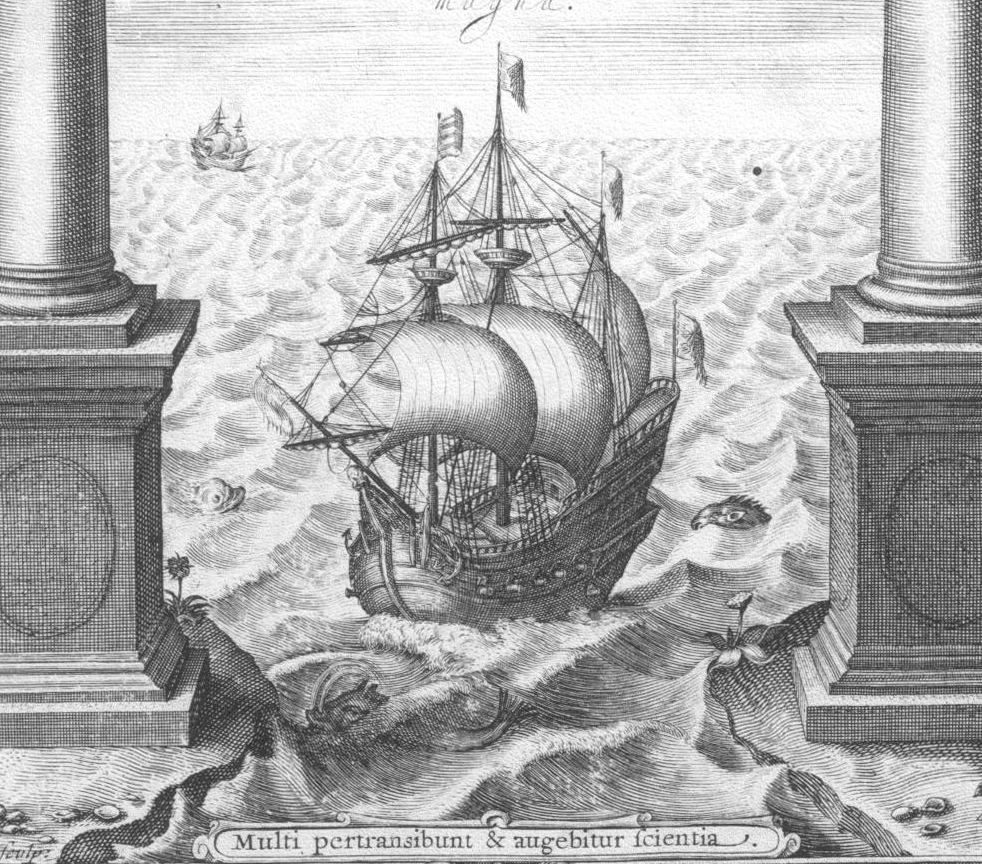
The title page of Francis Bacon's Novum Organum Scientiarum (1620) depicts a galleon passing between the mythical Pillars of Hercules that stand on either side of the Strait of Gibraltar, marking the exit from the well-charted waters of the Mediterranean into the unknowns of the Atlantic Ocean. The Pillars have been smashed through by European sailors, leading to the discovery of previously unknown continents. Bacon argues that a new method for attaining knowledge will begin a similar era of new discovery. The Latin tag across the bottom – Multi pertransibunt & augebitur scientia – means "Many will travel and knowledge will be increased." The page was liberally copied from Andrés García de Céspedes's Regimiento de Navegación, published in 1606.

The origins of the philosophy of science as a field of inquiry distinct from epistemology extend back to Francis Bacon's (1561-1626) Novum Organum ("true directions concerning the interpretation of nature") and René Descartes' (1596-1650) Discourse on Method (full title: "Discourse on the Method of Rightly Conducting One's Reason and of Seeking Truth in the Sciences") and then continue with the 2nd edition of Isaac Newton's (1643-1727) Philosophiae Naturalis Principia Mathematica and David Hume's (1711-1776) An Enquiry Concerning Human Understanding in the 18th century.

19th-century scholars, including the philosopher and mathematician (and "father of sociology") Auguste Comte (1798-1857) and the physicist and philosopher Ernst Mach (1838-1916), frequently treated the history and philosophy of science as a single scholarly undertaking where the study of what science had been (its history) and what science ought to be (its methods and justifications) were productively intermingled. Comte and Mach were associated with the philosophical school of positivism, which also advanced ideas for the reform of history generally. "Historical" positivists argued that historians should pursue the objective truth of the past by allowing historical sources to "speak for themselves", without additional interpretation. The heavy emphasis placed by historical positivists on documentary sources led to the development of methods of source criticism, which seek to expunge bias and uncover original sources in their pristine state.

Under the influence of logical positivism in the early 20th century, the fields of philosophy of science and history of science began to separate. The philosopher of science Hans Reichenbach (1891-1953) introduced a distinction between the "context of discovery" (e.g. how scientists come up with ideas) and the "context of justification" (i.e. how those ideas are justified). The latter was demarcated as the proper domain of philosophy while the former was assigned to the attention of historians who, "chary about using the historical record to address...questions...about the justification of science", agreed to the divorce.

=== Paradigms ===
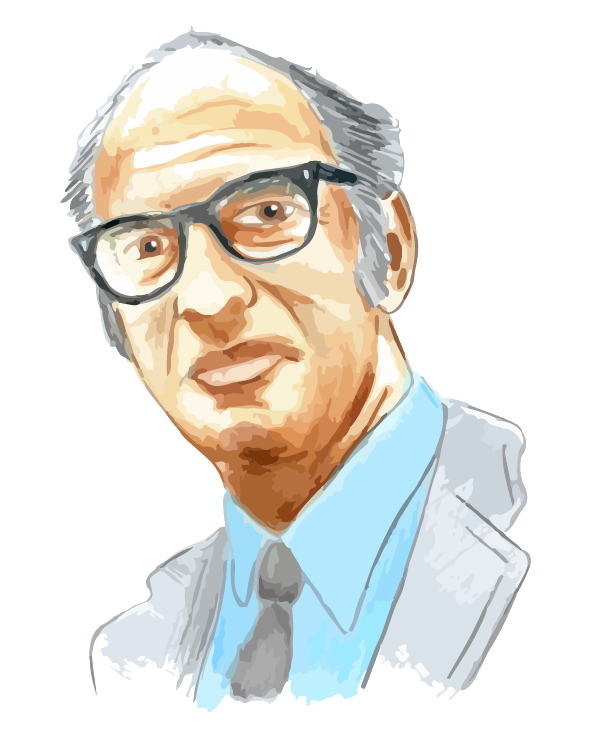
Thomas Kuhn is credited with coining the term "paradigm shift" to describe the creation and evolution of scientific theories.

Although most contemporary science historians now completely eschew philosophy a small, but influential, handful of scholars emerged in the 1960s to challenge the increasing separation of the history of science from the philosophy of science. In the "hyper-influential" The Structure of Scientific Revolutions, the historian and philosopher of science Thomas Kuhn (1922-1996) introduced the idea of "paradigm shift" in science, which is a fundamental change in the basic concepts and experimental practices of a scientific discipline. Kuhn wrote that while a given paradigm shift in science might occur for rational (or philosophic) reasons, at other times the shift happens for reasons that may have little to do with the objective merits of the science involved. By emphasizing the sociological nature of at least some paradigm shifts, however, Structure had the effect of distancing the history of science even further from philosophy. While Kuhn viewed himself as a philosopher-historian, the ironic impact of Structure was to even further exile philosophical questions from the practice of the history of science. Kuhn later abandoned the language of "paradigms" altogether. (Note: Decades after The Structure of Scientific Revolutions was published, Kuhn replaced the idea of paradigm shift with the idea that scientific language is a taxonomy and that a scientific revolution is essentially a restructuring of taxonomic categories. He adopted the model of the biological process of speciation to describe the birth of a new scientific specialty.)

The philosopher of science Paul Feyerabend (1924-1994) argued that scientific knowledge is not cumulative or progressive and that there can be no demarcation in terms of method between science and any other form of investigation The philosopher of science Gerd Buchdahl (1914-2001) wrote that Kuhn and Joseph Agassi (1927-2023) had demonstrated that historiographical views greatly influence the writing of the history of science. In Scientific Knowledge and its Social Problems (1971), the philosopher of science Jerome Ravetz's (1929-) referred to the role of the scientific community, as a social construct, in accepting or rejecting (objective) scientific knowledge.

Although his studies of scientific practice were at one time associated with social constructionist approaches to the philosophy of science, the philosopher Bruno Latour diverged significantly from such approaches and later insisted that he was interested in helping to rebuild trust in science and that some of the authority of science needed to be regained. According to Latour, the originality of science studies lies in demonstrating that facts are both real and constructed.

== Historians ==
=== Professionalization ===
From its modest beginnings early in the century, the history of science became firmly institutionalized in the United States between the 1950s and 1970s through a rapid expansion of academic programs and departments. I. Bernard Cohen (1914-2003) was the first person to receive a PhD in the History of Science in the U.S. in 1947 but, by the 1970s, scores of PhDs were being awarded each year in the U.S. By the end of the century, the history of science possessed all the institutional paraphernalia of a mature discipline, including graduate schools, research institutes, professional associations, specialized journals, conferences and awards, (Note: Including the George Sarton Medal and the John Desmond Bernal Prize for career achievement, the Pfizer Award for a scholarly book and the Watson, Helen, Miles, and Audrey Davis Prize for a book aimed at a nontechnical audience.) even if its dedicated university departments remained fewer and smaller than those of more established disciplines.

Cohen received his undergraduate degree in mathematics before becoming a graduate student in the history of science. He considered the completion of the first completely new translation into English in almost two centuries of Newton's Philosophiæ Naturalis Principia Mathematica to be his most important work. Other members of the first generation of professional historians of science followed a similar professional path (i.e. training first in the sciences). Alistair Crombie (1915–1996) earned a PhD in biology and zoology and worked for several years as a zoologist before pivoting to history. Charles Gillispie (1918–2015), who graduated with a degree in chemistry before earning his PhD in history, was the main editor of the massive (20 volume) Dictionary of Scientific Biography. Derek J. de Solla Price (1922–1983) spent ten years in experimental physics before pivoting to history to study the Antikythera mechanism, becoming the "herald" of scientometrics and the first recipient of the John Desmond Bernal Prize.

=== Whig history ===
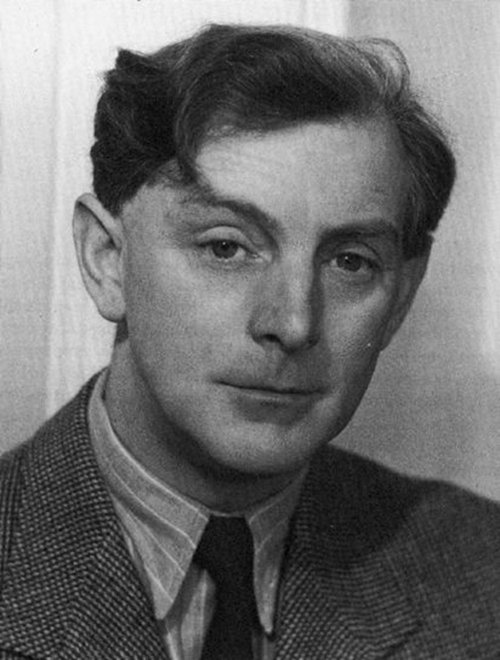
Sir Herbert Butterfield, Regius Professor of Modern History at the University of Cambridge (1963–1968)

The historian and philosopher of history Herbert Butterfield (1900-1979) published The Whig Interpretation of History in 1931, a book which would later come to have an enormous impact on science historians. Butterfield invented the label of "whig history" for historical narratives which interpret past events in terms of the present. He argued that writing history as a narrative of progress leads to the mistaken belief that the progressive sequence of events is "a line of causation", tempting the historian to go no further to investigate the causes of historical change. The focus on the present can also lead the historian to a special kind of "abridgement", selecting only those events that seem important from the present point of view or which serve the purposes of creating a narrative with "drama and apparent moral clarity". He also criticised it for modernising the past:

...the result [of whig history] is that to many of us [historical figures] seem much more modern than they really were, and even when we have corrected this impression by closer study we find it difficult to keep in mind the differences between their world and ours.

Whig history also easily lends itself to a view of history that is populated by heroes on the side of progress (or some other cherished modern value) while their confused, misguided or villainous opponents are portrayed, at best, as a "dummy that acts as a better foil to the grand whig virtues".

In place of a view of history as following some sort of inevitable or structural pattern, Butterfield urged historians to see the past as if the future was unknown, to pay attention to the accidental and contingent nature of historical events and "to evoke a certain sensibility towards the past, the sensibility which studies the past 'for the sake of the past', which delights in the concrete and the complex, which 'goes out to meet the past', which searches for 'unlikenesses between past and present'".

=== Specialization ===
Influenced by Butterfield, many of the professionalizing mid 20th-century historians of science saw the entire previous history of the history of science, written primarily by scientists, as a sustained centuries-long exercise in whiggism:

By the mid-1970s, it had become commonplace among historians of science to employ the terms "Whig" and "Whiggish", often accompanied by one or more of "hagiographic", "internalist", "triumphalist", even "positivist", to denigrate grand narratives of scientific progress....post-WWII champions of the newly professionalized history of science...were out to establish a critical distance between the history of science and the teaching and promotion of the sciences. In particular, they were suspicious of the grand celebratory and didactic narratives of scientific discovery and progress...

The professionalization of the history of science has been accompanied by a prodigious and proliferating specialization, with the field seeming to strive to match the protean diversity of modern science itself. Butterfield called such specialization "technical history", and he said it was the counterpart to "abridged" (whig) history. As the historian Roy Porter notes, "in specialization lies safety" (from whiggism). By restricting their inquiries to extremely specific and/or highly technical niches and producing micro-studies, science historians are almost guaranteed to make themselves invulnerable to charges of whiggism. But some observers, including Porter, warn that this defensive strategy may have a cost:

...there are dangers too in the alternatives to Whig history. On the one hand looms the prospect of overspecialisation, narrowness and fragmentation. Few general historians are any longer prepared to chance their arm at writing the histories of whole societies over spans of centuries; and historians of science have caught the same disease. Even at the level of student textbooks, professional historians of science have ceased to write synoptic histories of science.

The historian William Cronon insists that "[a]bridgement - and with it, by Butterfield’s own argument, whiggish history - is inescapable":

...without abridgement, there can be no history. Historians distill the nearly infinite records of the past in order to impose some semblance of order on what would otherwise feel like overwhelming chaos. This is all the more true when they seek to write for audiences other than their colleagues, whose patience for historical technicalities far surpasses that of the public. And because nonhistorians often do want to know how history relates to their own lives, there is no evading their demand for narratives that show how the present did indeed emerge from the past...Whenever historians seek to make their knowledge accessible to a wider world - whether in books, classrooms, museums, videos, websites, or blogs - they unfailingly abridge, simplify, analyze, synthesize, dramatize, and render judgments about why things happened as they did in the past, and why people should still care today.

Cronon says that "historians exist to explain the past to the present" and notes that Butterfield's own history of the Scientific Revolution "would seem to partake of at least a little whiggishness itself."

== Sociologists ==
=== Constructionism ===
While earlier scholars had advocated to a greater or lesser extent for the importance of considering external (i.e. outside of science) and/or non-empirical and non-rational social factors when trying to explain when or where science happens, the emergence of Sociology of Scientific Knowledge ("SSK") in the 1970s extended, amplified and intensified the earlier debate. "SSK explicitly adopted Kuhn at his philosophically most extravagant, and radicalized that stance even further" by wholly embracing externalist explanations related to the social organization of scientific activity and arguing that scientific knowledge has no special epistemological status compared to ordinary, non-scientific knowledge:

......what counts as knowledge in most social contexts it is tempting to call "customarily accepted belief". It is sustained by consensus and authority much as custom is sustained. It is developed and modified collectively, much as custom is developed and modified. This we might call the standard sociological conception of knowledge, the conception which both inspires and is confirmed by most of the empirical studies of knowledge undertaken in the social sciences. On inductive grounds one might expect this standard, widely applicable conception to make good sense of scientific knowledge and of the distinctions between knowledge and mere belief sustained and enforced by natural scientists. And so indeed it does. Scientific knowledge assimilates to the standard conception very readily, and much of profound importance can be discerned and understood when science is analysed in this way. But this is something that has only readily been acknowledged and accepted over the last two decades, and even now a sociological conception of scientific knowledge is still vigorously challenged and opposed...

While SSK-influenced sociologists do not deny the existence of "the real world", they do argue that reality is not "determinative" of what scientists believe. Instead these sociologists see science as "just another form of culture, rather than...something special and set apart" and scientific knowledge as something that is constructed rather than discovered.

=== Science of sociology ===
Sociologists have turned a skeptical eye on science while many scientists (as well as some philosophers and historians) have accused some sociologists of ignorance the field they are studying. Scientists claim that multi-generational intellectual laziness and complacency has left their entire field unequipped to offer anything more than a primitive caricature of the vast intellectual landscape they have never bothered to map.

== Terminology ==
As early as the eleventh edition of the Encyclopædia Britannica (1910-1911), the word "science" had acquired an extremely broad meaning in English:

...science may be defined as ordered knowledge of natural phenomena and of the relations between them...The beginnings of physical science are to be sought in the slow and unconscious observation by primitive races of men of natural occurrences, such as the apparent movements of the heavenly bodies...

More recently, the historian of computing R. Anthony Hyman (1928-2011) has warned against inappropriate use of the word "science":

One may be reasonably clear what "science" means in the 19th century and most of the 18th century. In the 17th century "science" has very different meaning. Chemistry, for example, was then inextricably mixed up with alchemy. Before the 17th century dissecting out such a thing as "science" in anything like the modern sense of the term involves profound distortions.

Similarly, the historian Scott Hendrix has argued that the word "science" as it is used by 21st century English speakers means modern science and that the use of the word to describe pre-modern scholars is misleading. "[E]ven an astute reader is prompted to classify intellectual exercises of the past as 'scientific'...based upon how closely those activities appear to mirror the activities of a modern scientist." Noting that natural philosophy was a far more neutral term than "science", Hendrix recommended that term be used instead when discussing pre-modern scholars of the natural world. "[T]here are sound reasons for a return to the use of the term natural philosophy that, for all its imprecision, reveals rather than imposes meaning on the past."

Confusion about the meaning of the word "science" has encouraged charges of Eurocentrism and complaints that the contributions of non-European civilizations to human knowledge of the natural world - Egyptian, Mesopotamian, Arabic, Indian, and Chinese - have been marginalized.

The science historian Hendrik Floris Cohen proposed using the term nature-knowledge (natuurkennis in Dutch) as a more neutral term than either natural philosophy or science to describe the highly diverse approaches to understanding the natural world undertaken by different cultures:

Instead, the unit of analysis I have in the end found myself working with is modes of nature-knowledge. By this I mean consistent ranges of distinct approaches to natural phenomena, which may differ in several dimensions. Their scope may have been comprehensive, with a view to deriving the whole wide world from first principles, or deliberately partial. The way in which knowledge was attained may have been predominantly empiricist or chiefly intellectualist. If any practices went with a given mode of nature-knowledge, these may have been observational, experimental, instrumental, etc. Knowledge may have been sought for its own sake or with a view to achieving certain practical improvements. Exchange may or may not have taken place between practitioners of distinct modes of nature-knowledge that were pursued at the same time and place.

== See also ==
- The British Journal for the History of Science
- Heroic theory of invention and scientific development
- The History and Present State of Electricity (1767)
- History of Science (journal)
- History of Science Society – Professional society for academic study
- Isis (journal)
- James B. Conant – American chemist (1893–1978)
- Professionalization and institutionalization of history
- Metascience – Scientific study of science
- Protoscience – Research field that may become a science
- Pseudoscience – Unscientific claims presented as scientific
- Strong programme – School of thought in sociology
