= Nationalist historiography =

Nationalist historiography is a branch of historiography which talks about history in regards to the emergence of the forces of nationalism in a nation. Nationalism, a set of beliefs about political legitimacy and cultural identity, has been a pervasive influence on history, providing a significant framework for historical writing in Europe and in those former colonies influenced by Europe since the nineteenth century. This nationalist model of history is typically used by official school textbooks.

== Origins ==
Nationalist history might be defined as history which uses the nation as its main category for historical people, places and actions. The eighteenth and nineteenth century saw the emergence of nationalist ideologies. John Breuilly notes how the "historical grounding of nationalism was reinforced by its close ties with the emergence of professional academic historical writing." During the French Revolution a national identity was crafted, identifying the common people with the Gauls. In Germany historians and humanists, such as Johann Gottfried Herder and Johann Gottlieb Fichte, identified a linguistic and cultural identity of the German nation, which became the basis of a political movement to unite the fragmented states of this German nation.

A significant historiographical outcome of this movement of German nationalism was the formation of a "Society for Older German Historical Knowledge", which sponsored the editing of a massive collection of documents of German history, the Monumenta Germaniae Historica. The sponsors of the MGH, as it is commonly known, defined German history very broadly; they edited documents concerning all territories where German-speaking people had once lived or ruled. Thus, documents from Italy to France to the Baltic were grist for the mill of the MGH's editors.

This model of scholarship focusing on detailed historical and linguistic investigations of the origins of a nation, set by the founders of the MGH, was imitated throughout Europe. In this framework, historical phenomena were interpreted as they related to the development of the nation-state; the state was projected into the past. National histories are thus expanded to cover everything that has ever happened within the largest extent of the expansion of a nation, turning Mousterian hunter-gatherers into incipient Frenchmen. Conversely, historical developments spanning many current countries may be ignored, or analysed from narrow parochial viewpoints.

The efforts of these nineteenth century historians provided the intellectual foundations for both justifying the creation of new nation states and the expansion of already existing ones. As Georg Iggers notes, these historians were often highly partisan and "went into the archives to find evidence that would support their nationalistic and class preconceptions and thus give them the aura of scientific authority." Paul Lawrence concurs, noting how – even with nationalisms still without states – historians "often sought to provide a historical basis for the claims to nationhood and political independence of states that did not yet exist."

== Time depth and ethnicity ==
The difficulty faced by any national history is the changeable nature of ethnicity. That one nation may turn into another nation over time, both by splitting (colonization) and by merging (syncretism, acculturation) is implicitly acknowledged by ancient writers; Herodotus describes the Armenians as "colonists of the Phrygians", implying that at the time of writing clearly separate groups originated as a single group. Similarly, Herodotus refers to a time when the "Athenians were just beginning to be counted as Hellenes", implying that a formerly Pelasgian group over time acquired "Greekness". The Alamanni are described by Asinius Quadratus as originally a conglomerate of various tribes which acquired a common identity over time. All these processes are summarized under the term ethnogenesis.

In ancient times, ethnicities often derived their or their rulers' origin from divine or semi-divine founders of a mythical past (for example, the Anglo-Saxons deriving their dynasties from Woden; see also Euhemerism). In modern times, such mythical aetiologies in nationalist constructions of history were replaced by the frequent attempt to link one's own ethnic group to a source as ancient as possible, often known not from tradition but only from archaeology or philology, such as Armenians claiming as their origin the Urartians, the Albanians claiming as their origin the Pelasgians (supposedly including Illyrians, Epirotes, and Ancient Macedonians), the Georgians claiming as their origin the Mushki, the Romanians claiming as their origin the Dacians, the Hungarians claiming as their origin various nomadic empires like the Avars, Huns, and Scythians, the Poles and Lithuanians claiming as their origin the Sarmatians—all of the mentioned groups being known only from either ancient historiographers or archaeology.

== Nationalism and ancient history ==
Nationalist ideologies frequently employ results of archaeology and ancient history as propaganda, often significantly distorting them to fit their aims, cultivating national mythologies and national mysticism. Frequently this involves the uncritical identification of one's own ethnic group with some ancient or even prehistoric (known only archaeologically) group, whether mainstream scholarship accepts as plausible or reject as pseudoarchaeology the historical derivation of the contemporary group from the ancient one. The decisive point, often assumed implicitly, that it is possible to derive nationalist or ethnic pride from a population that lived millennia ago and, being known only archaeologically or epigraphically, is not remembered in living tradition.

Examples include Kurds claiming as their origin the Medes, Albanians claiming as their origin the Pelasgians, Bulgarians claiming as their origin the Thracians, Iraqis claiming as their origin the Sumerians, Georgians claiming as their origin the Mushki, Turks claiming as their origin the Trojans, Azerbaijanis claiming as their origin the Caucasian Albanians, all of the mentioned groups being known only from either ancient historiographers or archaeology. In extreme cases, nationalists will ignore the process of ethnogenesis altogether and claim ethnic identity of their own group with some scarcely attested ancient ethnicity known to scholarship by the chances of textual transmission or archaeological excavation.

Historically, various hypotheses regarding the Urheimat of the Proto-Indo-Europeans has been a popular object of patriotic pride, quite regardless of their respective scholarly values:

- Albanian nationalism: The descent from the Pelasgians (supposedly including Illyrians, Epirotes, and Ancient Macedonians)
- Romanian nationalism: Dacianism or Dacomania
- Greek nationalism: The supposedly Greek origins of the ancient Thracians, Illyrians and of the Minoan civilization.
- Northern European origins of an Aryan race (Germanic mysticism, Nazi mysticism, Ahnenerbe)
- Lithuanian Sarmatism: The Lithuanian origins of the Goths, Sarmatians and other Eastern European peoples.
- Slavic nationalisms: Polish Sarmatism and Great Lechia, North Macedonian Macedonism and Antiquization, Croatian Illyrian movement, Bulgarian Thracomania, Slovenian Venetic theory, Russian Tartarian Empire, etc.
- Armenian nationalism: Armenia, Subartu and Sumer
- Indian Indigenous Aryanism: believes that the Indo-European peoples originated in South Asia instead of Eastern Europe

Similarly, other ethnolinguistic groups (Proto-Dravidians and Proto-Altaics) have also been subjected to nationalistic revisionisms:

- Pan-Turkism and Neo-Eurasianism postulate mythical origins of humanity or culture in Central Asia, (Sun Language Theory, Arkaim)
- Tamil nationalism: lost continent of Kumari Kandam
- Korean nationalism: Koreanic origins of the Dongyi, the ancient inhabitants of eastern China

== Study ==
With historians such as Ernest Gellner, Benedict Anderson, and Anthony D. Smith adopting more critical approaches to nationalism, some began to look at how this ideology had affected the writing of history.

Smith, for instance, develops the concept of 'historicism' to describe an emerging belief in the birth, growth, and decay of specific peoples and cultures, which - in the eighteenth and nineteenth centuries - became "increasingly attractive as a framework for inquiry into the past and present and [...] an explanatory principle in elucidating the meaning of events, past and present".

Eric Hobsbawm pointed out the central role of the historical profession in the development of nationalism:

Historians are to nationalism what poppy-growers in Pakistan are to the heroin-addicts: we supply the essential raw material for the market. Nations without a past are contradictions in terms. What makes a nation is the past, what justifies one nation against others is the past, and historians are the people who produce it. So my profession, which has always been mixed up in politics, becomes an essential component of nationalism.

Martin Bernal's much debated book Black Athena (1987) argues that the historiography on ancient Greece has been in part influenced by nationalism and ethnocentrism. He also claimed that influences by non-Greek or non-Indo-European cultures on Ancient Greek were marginalized.

According to the medieval historian Patrick J. Geary:

[The] modern [study of] history was born in the nineteenth century, conceived and developed as an instrument of European nationalism. As a tool of nationalist ideology, the history of Europe's nations was a great success, but it has turned our understanding of the past into a toxic waste dump, filled with the poison of ethnic nationalism, and the poison has seeped deep into popular consciousness.

== By country ==
Nationalist historiographies have emerged in a number of countries and some have been subject to in-depth scholarly analysis.

=== Cuba ===
In 2007, Kate Quinn presented an analysis of the Cuban nationalist historiography.

=== Indonesia ===
In 2003, Rommel Curaming analyzed the Indonesian nationalistic historiography.

=== South Korea ===
Nationalist historiography in South Korea has been the subject of 2001 study by Kenneth M. Wells.

=== Thailand ===
In 2003, Patrick Jory analyzed the Thai nationalistic historiography.

=== Zimbabwe ===
In 2004, Terence Ranger noted that "Over the past two or three years there has emerged in Zimbabwe a sustained attempt by the Mugabe regime to propagate what is called ‘patriotic history’."

== See also ==
- Afrocentrism
- Gothicism
- Historical revisionism
- Historical negationism
- Irredentism
- Methodological nationalism
- Nationalisms Across the Globe
- National myth
- Nationalism and archaeology
- Nationalization of history
- Nazi archaeology
- Primordialism
- Romantic nationalism
- Politics of archaeology in Israel and Palestine
