= Harris Mylonas =

- Χάρης Μυλωνάς
- Born: November 16, 1978 (age 47); Thessaloniki, Greece
- Title: editor-in-chief, Nationalities Papers

Academic background
- Education: National and Kapodistrian University of Athens (BA), University of Chicago (MA), Yale University (PhD), Harvard University (Postdoctoral Fellow)

Academic work
- Discipline: Political Science
- Institutions: George Washington University, Harvard University, Korea University
- Main interests: nationalism, nation-building, diasporas, civil wars, migration.
- Website: harrismylonas.com

Harris Mylonas (Greek: Χάρης Μυλωνάς) is a Greek American political scientist. He is a Professor of Political Science and International Affairs and the Director of the Institute for European, Russian, and Eurasian Studies at George Washington University, a lifetime member of the Council on Foreign Relations, and the editor-in-chief for Nationalities Papers, a peer-reviewed academic journal published by Cambridge University Press.

Mylonas has contributed to the ideas of nationalism, nation-building, state-building, fifth column politics and multilateralism through different publications and articles. Mylonas has also contributed to the analysis of the Greek government-debt crisis.

He is the author of The Politics of Nation-Building: Making Co-Nationals, Refugees, and Minorities, which was awarded the Peter Katzenstein Book Prize in September 2013 and the 2014 European Studies Book Award by the Council for European Studies. He has co-authored Varieties of Nationalism: Communities, Narratives, Identities and has co-edited Enemies Within: The Global Politics of Fifth Columns as well as The Microfoundations of Diaspora Politics. He is currently working on another book project, Diaspora Management Logics.

Beyond academia, Mylonas co-produces the podcast American Constitutive Stories. His documentary Searching for Andreas: Political Leadership in Times of Crisis (2018), which deals with the deep causes of the recent financial and political crisis in Greece, premiered at the 2018 Thessaloniki Documentary Festival and won two awards at the 2019 International Documentary Festival of Ierapetra. His recent TEDx talk Nation-building: Past, Present, Future summarizes his perspective on nationalism and nation-building through his family history. His commentary has appeared in The Washington Post, Foreign Affairs, Foreign Policy, CNN.com, The Guardian, Los Angeles Times, and other media outlets. He has also been featured on BBC, CNN, Voice of America, and CBC Radio, among others.

== Academic career ==
Mylonas was born in Thessaloniki and graduated from the Anatolia College High school in 1996. He then moved to Athens where he earned his BA in Political Science and Public Administration (2000) and MSc in Political Science and Sociology (2002) from the University of Athens. He continued his studies in the United States with support from the Fulbright Program earning an M.A. in political science from the University of Chicago and a Ph.D. in political science from Yale University. He joined the faculty of the Elliott School of International Affairs at the George Washington University in 2009. He also served as an Academy Scholar at the Harvard Academy for International and Area Studies at the Weatherhead Center for International Affairs in 2008–09 and 2011–12 academic years.

Mylonas served as Associate Dean for Research in the Elliott School of International Affairs at George Washington University during 2017–18. He has held visiting positions at Korea University in Seoul, the Centre français des études éthiopiennes (CFEE) in Addis Ababa, and the Carlos III–Juan March Institute (IC3JM) in Madrid. He also served as the chair of the Council for European Studies’ Historical Study of States and Regimes Research Network from 2019 to 2021. For the past fifteen years, Mylonas has been a member of the board of directors is a member of the board of directors of the Association for the Study of Nationalities, an academic association dedicated to the understanding of ethnicity and nationalism with a geographic focus in Central, Eastern, and Southeastern Europe, and Eurasia.

== Selected publications ==
Books

- 2023. Varieties of Nationalism: Communities, Narratives, Identities. New York: Cambridge University Press (co-authored with Maya Tudor).
  - Review, by Øyvind Østerud, Journal of Peace Research.
  - Review, by Idlir Lika, Ethnic and Racial Studies.
  - Review, by Katerina Sviderska, Politique et Sociétés.
  - Review, by Bern DySart, Sociology.
- 2012. The Politics of Nation-Building: Making Co-Nationals, Refugees, and Minorities. New York: Cambridge University Press.
  - Review, by Karlo Basta, Canadian Journal of Political Science, Volume 49, Issue 01, March 2016, pp 173–174.
  - Review, by Jan Erk, Public Administration, Volume 92, Issue 2, June 2014, pp. 518–524.
  - Review, by Dmitry Gorenburg in Perspectives on Politics, Volume 12 / Issue 02 / June 2014, pp 512–513.
  - Review, by Neovi M. Karakatsanis Journal of Modern Greek Studies Volume 32, Number 1, May 2014 p. 210–12.
  - Review, by Serhun Al in International Studies Review, Volume 16, Issue 2, June 2014, pp. 323–324.
  - Review, by Jan Jakub Muś in Nationalities Papers, Volume 42, Issue 5, 2014, pp. 905–906.
  - Review, by Jan Erk in Nations and Nationalism, Volume 20, Issue 3, July 2014, pp. 594–595.
  - Review, by Roberto Belloni in Südosteuropa, 61 (2013), 4, p. 595–597.
  - Review, by Georgi Derluguian in Modern Greek Studies Yearbook, Volume 28/29, 2012/2013, pp. 399–401.
  - Review by Olena Podolian in Europe-Asia Studies, Volume 66, No. 10, December 2014, pp. 1735–1737.
  - Review, by A. Paczynska. CHOICE: Current Reviews for Academic Libraries, Oct 2013 v51 i2 p350(1).

Edited Volumes

- 2022. Enemies Within: The Global Politics of Fifth Columns. New York: Oxford University Press (co-edited with Scott Radnitz).
  - Review, by Siniša Malešević, Nationalities Papers, March 2023.
  - Review, by Yana Volkova, Nationalism and Ethnic Politics, Volume 28, Issue 4, November 2022, pp 506–508.
- 2022. The Microfoundations of Diaspora Politics. New York: Routledge (co-edited with Alexandra Délano Alonso).

Articles

- 2026. "Theory before method: The case for methodological pluralism in political science, International Political Science Review (with H. Zeynep Bulutgil).
- 2026. “Eliminationist Politics: An Analytical Framework,” Journal of Ethnic and Migration Studies, Vol. 52, Issue 4: 891-909 (with Meghan Garrity).
- 2026. "Bensel's Modern Foundings: Connecting State, Nation, and Regime, through Juridical Equality," Political Science Quarterly, Vol. 141, Issue 1: 61-85 (with Deborah Boucoyannis).
- 2025. "Balance of Power, System Polarity and Irredentism," Journal of Global Security Studies, Vol. 10, Issue 1.
- 2025. "The Various Facets of Eliminationist Politics: Conflict, Nation-Building, and Forced Migration," International Political Science Review Vol. 46, Issue 3: 336 –352 (with Meghan Garrity).
- 2024. "Suppress or Support? Great Powers and Revolutionary Agency in the Greek War of Independence," Nationalism and Ethnic Politics, Vol. 30, Issue 4: 449-467 (with Elpida Vogli).
- 2022. "Pandemic Nationalism," Nationalities Papers, Vol. 50, Issue 1: 3-12 (with Ned Whalley).
- 2022. "Nation-Building and the Role of Identity in Civil Wars," Ethnopolitics, Vol. 21, Issue 1: 1-21 (with Kendrick Kuo).
- 2021. "Nationalism: What We Know and What We Still Need to Know" Annual Review of Political Science, Volume 24: 109-132. (with Maya Tudor).
- 2021. "Exchange on the quantitative measurement of ethnic and national identity" Nations and Nationalism, Volume 27, Issue 1: 22-40. (with Daniel Bochsler, Elliott Green, Erin Jenne, and Andreas Wimmer).
- 2020. "The Determinants of Successful Nation-building: Macro-sociological Political Modernization and Political Alliance Structures" Nationalities Papers.
- 2020. "Nation-Building," Oxford Bibliographies in International Relations.
- 2019."Nation‐building policies in the Balkans: an Ottoman or a manufactured legacy?," Nations and Nationalism, Volume 25, Issue 3: 866–887.
- 2019."The microfoundations of diaspora politics: unpacking the state and disaggregating the diaspora," Journal of Ethnic and Migration Studies, Volume 45, Issue 4: 473–491 (with Alexandra Délano Alonso)
- 2019."Foreign policy priorities and ethnic return migration policies: group-level variation in Greece and Serbia," Journal of Ethnic and Migration Studies, Volume 45, Issue 4: 613–635 (with Marko Žilović)
- 2017. “Methodological Challenges in the Study of Stateless Nationalist Territorial Claims,” Territory, Politics, Governance, Volume 5, Issue 2: 145–157 (with Nadav Shelef).
- 2016. “Threats to Territorial Integrity, National Mass Schooling, and Linguistic Commonality,” Comparative Political Studies, Volume 49, No. 11: 1446-1479 (with Keith Darden).
- 2015. “Methodological Problems in the Study of Nation-Building: Behaviorism and Historicist Solutions in Political Science,” Social Science Quarterly, Volume 96, Issue 3: 740–758.
- 2014. "Which Land is Our Land? Domestic Politics and Change in the Territorial Claims of Stateless Nationalist Movements,” Security Studies, Vol. 23, Issue 4, 754–786 (with Nadav Shelef).
- 2014. "Democratic Politics in Times of Austerity: The Limits of Forced Reform in Greece," Perspectives on Politics, Vol. 12, No. 2 (June): 435–443.
- 2014. “Interstate Relations, Perceptions, And Power Balance: Explaining China’s Policies Toward Ethnic Groups, 1949-1965,” Security Studies, Vol. 23, 148–181 (with Enze Han).
- 2012. “The Promethean Dilemma: Third-Party State-building in Occupied Territories”, Ethnopolitics, Issue 1, March, pp. 85–93 (with Keith Darden).
- 2008. “When do Votes Count? Regime Type, Electoral Conduct, and Political Competition in Africa.” Comparative Political Studies, Vol. 41, No. 11, 1466–1491 (with Nasos Roussias).
