= Ethnopolitics (journal) =

- Discipline: Political science
- Language: English
- Edited by: Karl Cordell; Stefan Wolff

Publication details
- Former name: Global Review of Ethnopolitics
- History: 2001–present
- Publisher: Routledge (United Kingdom)
- Frequency: 5/year

Standard abbreviations
- ISO 4: Ethnopolitics

Indexing
- ISSN: 1744-9065 (print); 1744-9065 (web)
- OCLC no.: 300873767
- Online archive

Ethnopolitics, formerly known as Global Review of Ethnopolitics, is a peer-reviewed academic journal focusing on the intersection of ethnic groups and politics. It was established in the United Kingdom by the Political Studies Association's Specialist Group on Ethnopolitics. Its editor-in-chief is Stefan Wolff.

Ethnopolitics is now published in collaboration with the Association for the Study of Nationalities.
