= Nationalization of history =

Nationalization of history is the term used in historiography to describe the process of separation of "one's own" history from the common universal history, by way of perceiving, understanding and treating the past that results with construction of history as history of a nation. If national labeling of the past is not treated with great care, it can result in the retrospective nationalization of history and even assigning nonexistent or exaggerated existing national attributes to historical events and persons. Nationalization of history, which began after a period of globalization of history, was not only one of the causes, but also the result of the process of establishment of modern nations (national revival).

== Universal history ==
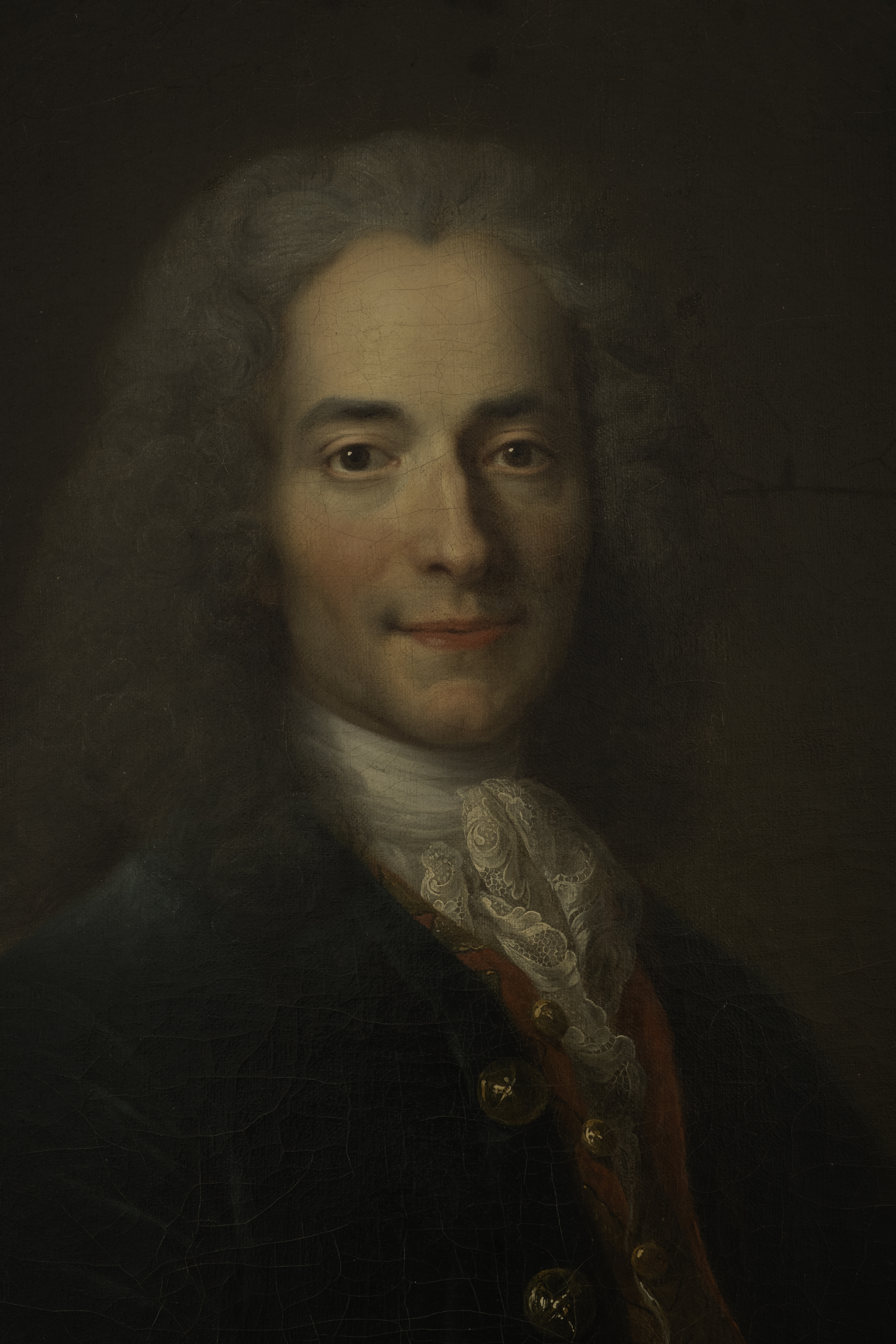
Voltaire was the first in the modern period who attempted to write a history of the world, without use of religious and nationalistic interpretations of the past.

Universal history, the result of a universal, cosmopolitan interpretation of historical events and mankind as a whole, coherent unit, preceded the nationalization of history. In the Western world, this motivation to imagine a universal history became influential in the 18th century when numerous philosophers promoted new cosmopolitan ideologies, after the ethno-religious conflicts of the previous century, and the subsequent consolidation of states which attempted to impose themselves over religious particularisms. Colonial experience (many European countries had colonies) exposed society in Europe to numerous different cultures and civilizations. It is also very important to take in consideration that the 18th century was in the Age of Enlightenment when people's activities, both on individual and social level, were determined with desire to follow rational scientific judgment while changing the society, which released them from restraints of customs and arbitrary authorities based on faith, superstition, or revelation and backed up by religion or tradition. All these circumstances provided suitable surroundings for development of universalistic, liberal and rational global perspectives in studies of society and its past and writing historical texts.

In his Essay on customs (1756) Voltaire studied development of civilization in the world with universal perspective, rejecting tradition, Christian and national frames. He was significantly influenced by Jacques-Bénigne Bossuet and his work Discourse on the Universal history (1682) when he was first who seriously attempted to write a history of the world, without limits imposed by nation or religion, emphasizing economical, cultural and political history. Imanuel Kant developed ideas about universally applicable moral imperatives in his work Perpetual Peace (1795) and designed a plan for establishing a cosmopolitan liberal order which would result in perpetual peace. Universalism of the 18th century created an ideology which today could be identified as modern civil society.

The emerging of modern historiography is connected with German universities in the 19th century and the significant influence of Leopold von Ranke who insisted on objectivity and systematic use of historical documents in the form of authentic primary sources; his credo was to perform reconstruction of the past "as it was". Ranke's universal precepts in virtually all his works were, however, applied almost exclusively to the history of states and nations.

== Causes of nationalization of history ==
Though nationalization of history could probably be traced from the earliest phases of creating historical works, it was in the period after the French Revolution that creating of historical works started to be strongly influenced by national perspectives, and that perspective gradually became globally dominant with its culmination during the 19th and at the beginning of the 20th century. Nationalism was estimated as the proper perspective to such an extent that nationalization of history remained unnoticed till recently (1980s and 1990s) and was not studied in historiography in a scale that would correspond to its significance.

Many various reasons, depending on the circumstances, caused nationalization of history. Probably the most important is national revival, the important element of which was nationalized history, that resulted in the emerging of modern nations and nation-states, mostly during the 19th century. With the emerging of national states, a global universal approach to writing history lost ground to the nation-state and was very much captured by it even in a significant part of the 20th century. The professionalization and institutionalization of history that took part in nation-states' institutions during the 19th and first half of the 20th century was closely connected with the process of history's increasing nationalization. Nationalization of history was additionally entrenched by the development of national curricula in schools based on "monumental and prestigious" series of "authoritative" national stories, often written in insular style and justificatory manner.

Germany after Versailles: Administered by the League of Nations Annexed or transferred to neighboring countries by the treaty, or later via plebiscite and League of Nation action Weimar Germany

After the First World War was finished, in some cases during establishment of new frontiers, the principle of national self-determination was taken in consideration during frontier demarcation. Therefore, it was necessary to establish the national historical character of certain territories and settlements, like in case between Germany and Poland and the Versailles treaty when numerous historians prepared short studies in an attempt to support territory demands based on Germany or Poland.

After the Second World War and the process of decolonization, the process of establishing new countries led to additionally stimulated nationalization of history because "new flags requested new histories". Even when citizens of newly established countries already had their national identity built, the nationalization of history was aimed to create of new national identity based on citizenship. Canada is an example of an attempt at nationalization of history to create a shared, historically rooted identity for English and French Canadians. Causes of nationalization of history in former communist regimes, mostly at the end of the 20th century, can be also found in reaction on long-term submission to communist historical interpretations and forced disregard for bourgeois nationalistic past. In cases where one of the results of coloured revolutions (i.e. Georgia, Ukraine,...) was the desire to gain symbolic distance from a Soviet past, the nationalization of history was a tool for externalizing of the communist past and rediscovery of European national identity of nation.

== Renationalization of history ==
If the first phase of nationalization of history was forcibly suppressed by a national ideology (communism) or traumatic losing of wars (Japan, Germany, ...) there can be a second phase, renationalization of history, on usually changed basis and perspective of nationalism.

=== Renationalization of history in Ukraine ===
The nationalization of history in Ukraine had two separate phases:

- First phase began in the middle of the 19th century and reached its culmination in Mykhailo Hrushevsky's “History of Ukraine - Rus'”. This phase lasted till the end of the Second World War when it was stopped because of political changes in the Soviet Union, while in diasporas Hrushevsky's text had cult status.
- Second phase started in the 1980s and still lasts as of 2010, as a consequence of direct state sponsorship becoming an integral part of nationalization of the state. At the beginning, it was not so intensive, but after its turning point on August 24, 1991, it achieved special purposes: to legitimize the newly established state and its governing elites, establishing territorial and chronological conceptions of the Ukrainian nation, and to confirm the appropriateness of its existence as legal successor in the consciousness of its citizens and neighbours.

The first phase chronologically coincided with the process of "rediscovery of tradition" and national revival that captured all of Europe, while the second phase takes place in a period of globalization, vanishing cultural frontiers and aggressive international forms of mass culture.

== Legacy ==
=== Nation mythologies, histories and states ===
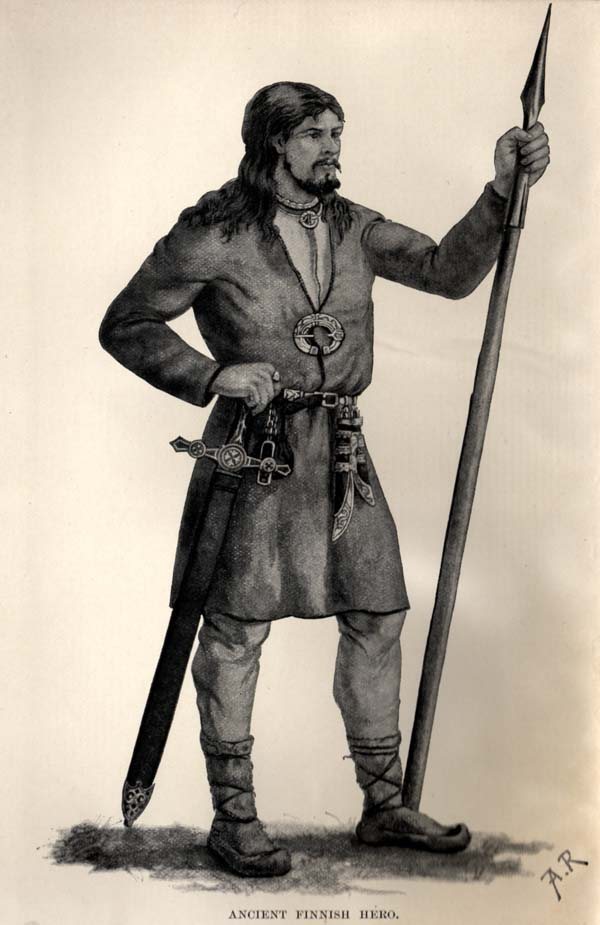
An ancient Finnish Hero – Illustration from Kalevala

One of the most important consequences of printed texts of nationalized history was that it provided a basis for national revivals in the process of creating modern nations. Projects of national awakenings captured nationalized history and turned it into a weapon of popularization of national myths in the period of establishing history as a social scientific discipline. A shortcut to production of national mythologies that proves ancient origins of modern nations, providing them with a respectable past, was forgery of historical documents, literature and historical works that were lost for some time, and then suddenly rediscovered to the approval of an astonished grateful public. Authors of such rediscovered treasures that were in a quest for success and glory did not suspect that they were in fact builders of as yet nonexistent modern nations. Even when it was obvious that certain texts were basically invented national myths, many social groups, and even intellectuals, wanted to believe that they were authentic national epics, like the Kalevala in Finland.

The nationalization of history, which had its origins more in the epics and tendentious oratory than in philosophy, sometimes grew the idea of an esprit des peuples or national spirit and later still the idea that each nation had a 'mission'. Such ideas evolved not into groups of associated individuals, but into universal spirits that is said to be able to destroy individuals and nations.

The nationalization of history was an important element of national revival and creating new nation states in the 19th and the beginning of the 20th century. New nation states and their institutions had the most important role in social process of the professionalization and institutionalization of history that was additionally supporting the process of nationalization of history. The final consequence was that national history regarded the nation-state as the primary unit of historical analysis.

=== Society and nature ===
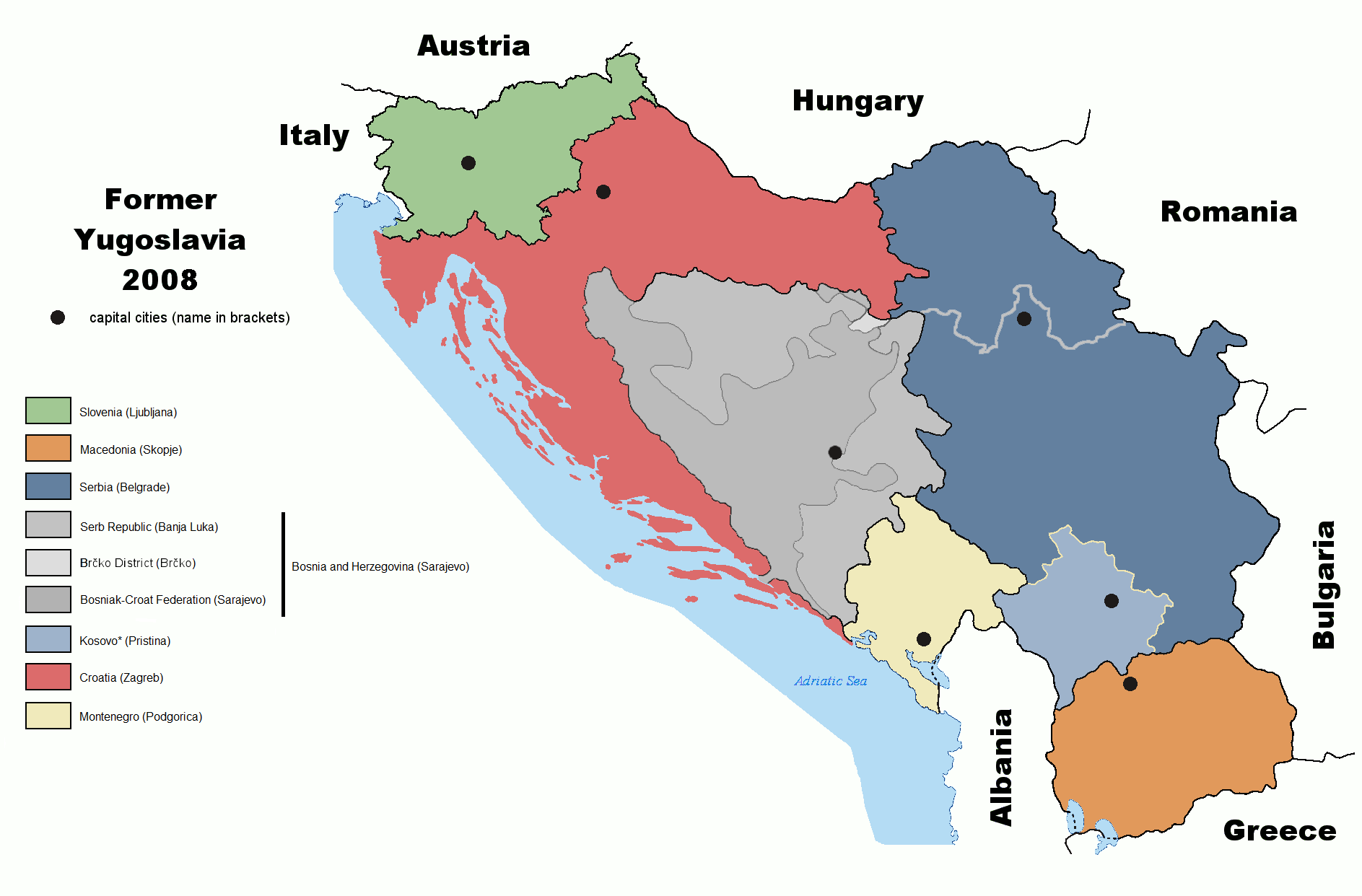
State entities on the former territory of Yugoslavia, 2008.

The nationalization of history affects all aspects of life, from relationships with other nationalities to architecture. That is a result of the fact that nationalization of history corresponds with nationalization of nature and the fact that reservations and hostilities toward other nations accompanied nationalism from the beginning. At the end of the 20th century were extreme nationalistic interpretations of Balkan and Caucasus history, which became powerful weapons in ethno-territorial conflicts and accelerated disintegration of multinational states like Yugoslavia and the Soviet Union.

After disintegration of multinational states like Yugoslavia and Soviet Union, besides the process of renationalization of history, there is sometimes also retroactive nationalization of victims or tragedies of the people that in past lived in those states. According to new national historical narratives, the reason for some people were the victims of certain tragedies was because they were of a certain nationality, for example the Ukrainians of the Soviet Union. Nationalist discourse in Croatia presents the Bleiburg repatriations as an event in which only Croatians suffered and died just because they were Croatians but eludes the fact that many of the victims were Serbs, Montenegrins or Slovenians, and many Croatians had died fighting as collaborators against Yugoslav partisans.

=== Denationalization of history ===
The nationalization of history has been increasingly called into question, and one of its consequences is the emerging of processes of denationalization of history, which is the result of an intention to change the perspective of creating works about history by promoting pluralism and international standards in social sciences. In Central and Eastern Europe there are tensions between nationalization of history and the process of European integrations. That is one of reasons for organized activities aimed toward denationalization of history.

If history was reinterpreted and filtered by the media and official orthodoxy, there is a situation in which the nationalization of history leads to its denial.

== See also ==
- National mysticism
- Nationalist historiography
