= Andreas Wimmer =

Swiss sociologist

- Born: 1962 (age 63–64)
- Awards: Stein Rokkan Prize for Comparative Social Science Research (2019)

Academic background
- Education: University of Zurich (PhD); University of Copenhagen (Honorary PhD); McGill University (Honorary PhD)

Academic work
- Discipline: Sociology and Political Science
- Institutions: Columbia University

Andreas Wimmer is a Swiss sociologist who is the Lieber Professor of Sociology and Political Philosophy at Columbia University. He has a PhD in social anthropology from the University of Zurich. He is known for his research on nationalism, nation building, and ethnic conflict. He is credited with having "notably revitalized the macropolitical study of nationalism."

== Early life and education ==
Wimmer was born in Switzerland. He pursued his academic studies at the University of Zurich, where he earned a PhD in Social anthropology in 1992. He continued his studies at the same institution, receiving a Habilitation in Social Anthropology in 1994. Beginning with anthropological fieldwork (in an indigenous community in Mexico), he moved to comparative historical analysis, and onward to the analysis of large-scale quantitative datasets, formal modelling, and online experiments. Wimmer is proficient in multiple languages, including German (his mother tongue), Spanish, French, English, and Italian.

== Career ==
Prior to his current position at Columbia University, Wimmer held numerous academic roles, including Director of the Fung Global Fellows Program at Princeton University (2014–2015) and Hughes-Rogers Professor of Sociology at Princeton University (2012–2015). He was a professor at the University of California, Los Angeles (UCLA) from 2003 to 2014 and has previously taught at the University of Bonn, where he was one of the founding directors of the Center for Development Research; the University of Neuchâtel, where he was founding director of the Swiss Forum for Migration Studies; and the University of Zurich. While directing the Swiss Forum for Migration Studies, Wimmer was involved in national policy making and instrumental in revising the country’s system of immigration.

Wimmer has held visiting positions at the École des Hautes Études en Sciences Sociales in Paris, the Institute for Advanced Study in Humanities and Social Sciences at Zhejiang University, the Wissenschaftskolleg in Berlin, the European University Institute in Florence, Kyoto University, St. Anthony’s College at the University of Oxford, and the United States Institute of Peace, among others. Early in his career, he won a Heisenberg Fellowship from the German Science Foundation. He has been awarded two honorary PhDs, one from McGill University and one from the University of Copenhagen.

Wimmer has contributed to general readership publications, such as Foreign Affairs, The Yale Review, or Aeon. His work has been published in 14 languages, including Chinese, Turkish (forthcoming), Persian, Arabic (forthcoming), German, Hungarian, Italian, Spanish, Russian, Slovak, Romanian, Danish, Kazakh, and Greek. He edits a book series on Global and Comparative Sociology for Princeton University Press and served on the editorial boards of several top journals in sociology and political science. He is a member of the Council on Foreign Relations and a fellow of the Boundaries, Membership, and Belonging group of the Canadian Institute for Advanced Research.

== Research focus and contributions ==
Wimmer's research takes a global, comparative, and historical approach to examine how ethnic and racial groups form and dissolve, the global spread of nationalism, and the nation-state associated ethnic conflicts. He focuses on the roles of ideology, power dynamics, and social networks. He is known for theoretical contributions—such as methodological nationalism and ethnic boundary making—and empirical work on civil wars, nation-building, and immigration. His four major books form a cohesive tetralogy.

=== Nationalist Exclusion and Ethnic Conflict. Shadows of Modernity ===
In Nationalist Exclusion and Ethnic Conflict, Wimmer argues that nationalism heightened the political significance of ethnic divisions by replacing older social hierarchies with new ethnoracial ones. He critiques classical and modern social theories for overlooking these exclusionary dynamics, which he sees as inherent to modern nation-states. To illustrate this, Wimmer compares Switzerland, Iraq, and Mexico—three disparate cases—to show how varying definitions of national boundaries shaped ethnic hierarchies in different ways. Switzerland developed a multi-ethnic political system, but excluded immigrants from equal participation; in contrast, Iraq and pre-revolutionary Mexico marginalized ethnic minorities while drawing less rigid lines between nationals and immigrants.

=== Ethnic Boundary Making. Institutions, Networks, and Power ===
In Ethnic Boundary Making, Wimmer shifts focus to how individuals construct and negotiate ethnic, racial, and national boundaries in everyday life. Challenging both essentialist and overly individualist views, he builds on Fredrik Barth’s concept of ethnicity as a social boundary. The book presents a framework explaining why such boundaries vary in strength, political relevance, and durability, arguing that they emerge through power-dependent negotiations over which group categories are deemed legitimate. Empirical chapters illustrate this theory using diverse methods, from historical analysis to advanced social network techniques.

=== Waves of War. Nationalism, State Formation, and Ethnic Exclusion in the Modern World ===
In Waves of War (2013), Wimmer argues that nationalism is a key driver of modern warfare, challenging traditional views that treat it as mere state propaganda or insurgent rhetoric. Using global historical data, he shows that the spread of the nationalist ideal of self-rule triggered successive waves of conflict as empires collapsed and new nation-states emerged. Nationalism undermined imperial hierarchies by labeling them “foreign rule,” fueling wars of independence. The book concludes that transitions to nation-states are inherently conflict-prone due to struggles over ethnopolitical inequality.

=== Nation Building: Why Some Countries Come Together While Others Fall Apart ===
Wimmer was awarded the 2019 Stein Rokkan Prize for Comparative Social Science Research in recognition of his book Nation Building: Why Some Countries Come Together While Others Fall Apart. In the book, he argues that three factors tend to determine whether nation-building succeeds in the long term: "the early development of civil-society organisations, the rise of a state capable of providing public goods evenly across a territory, and the emergence of a shared medium of communication." Harris Mylonas described the book as an "instant classic comparable to Karl Deutsch's Nationalism and Social Communication (1953) or Ernest Gellner's Nations and Nationalism (1983)."

Wimmer does not see ethnic or racial diversity in themselves as detrimental to nation-building. Groups that have access to power, and feel that their group is included in a nation, are more likely to report pride in that nation. Where political institutions become exclusionary, ethnic groups are less likely to feel a sense of national belonging and more likely to emphasize their distinct ethnic origins.

Wimmer argues instead that linguistic diversity is a key stumbling block to nation-building. He argues that a shared language makes it easier for political alliances and networks reach across ethnic and racial divides and thus contribute to shared national identification.

== Awards ==
In 2024, Wimmer was awarded an honorary Ph.D. by the University of Copenhagen and elected a Fellow of the European Academy of Sociology for his distinguished contributions to the discipline. Earlier accolades include the Distinguished Career Award from the International Migration Section of the American Sociological Association (2018), membership in the Sociological Research Association (since 2016), a Doctor of Letters honoris causa from McGill University (2016), and the Distinguished Scholar Award from the Ethnicity, Nationalism, and Migration Section of the International Studies Association (2014).

In addition to these major awards, Wimmer’s articles and books have been widely recognized by academic bodies across disciplines. He has received honors from the International Science Council (2019), the Comparative Historical, International Migration, Global and Transnational Sociology, Cultural Sociology, Peace, War and Social Conflict, Mathematical Sociology, Rationality and Society, Theory, and Political Sociology sections of the American Sociological Association; the Association for the Study of Nationalities (2019); the European Academy of Sociology (2013); the International Network of Analytical Sociologists (2013); the Modeling and Simulation Section of the German Sociological Association (2012); and the Thyssen Foundation (2002/2003). These numerous accolades underscore the broad impact and interdisciplinary reach of his work.

== Selected works ==
- Wimmer, A., & Glick Schiller, N. (2002). Methodological nationalism and beyond: Nation–state building, migration, and the social sciences. Global Networks, 2(4), 301–334. https://doi.org/10.1111/1471-0374.00043
- Wimmer, A. (2013). Ethnic boundary making: Institutions, power, networks. Oxford University Press.
- Wimmer, A. (2008). The making and unmaking of ethnic boundaries: A multilevel process theory. American Journal of Sociology, 113(4), 970–1022. https://doi.org/10.1086/522804
- Wimmer, A. (2002). Nationalist exclusion and ethnic conflict: Shadows of modernity. Cambridge University Press.
- Wimmer, A., Cederman, L. E., & Min, B. (2009). Ethnic politics and armed conflict: A configurational analysis of a new global data set. American Sociological Review, 74(2), 316–337. https://doi.org/10.1177/000312240907400207
- Wimmer, A., & Lewis, K. (2010). Beyond and below racial homophily: ERG models of a friendship network documented on Facebook. American Journal of Sociology, 116(2), 583–642. https://doi.org/10.1086/653506
- Wimmer, A. (2008). Elementary strategies of ethnic boundary making. Ethnic and Racial Studies, 31(6), 1025–1055. https://doi.org/10.1080/01419870802350869
- Wimmer, Andreas, Seungwon Lee, and Jack LaViolette. "Diffusion through multiple domains: The spread of romantic nationalism across Europe, 1770-1930", in American Journal of Sociology 130(4): 931-975, 2025.
- Wimmer, Andreas, Bart Bonikowsi, Charles Crabtree, Zheng Fu, Matt Golder, and Kiyoteru Tsutsui. "Geo-political rivalry and anti-immigrant sentiment. A conjoint experiment in 22 countries", in American Political Science Review, 2024.
- Feinstein, Yuval and Andreas Wimmer. “Consent and legitimacy. A revised bellicose theory of state building with evidence from around the world, 1500-2000”, in World Politics 75(1): 188-232, 2023
