= Nation-building =

Constructing national identity using state power

Nation-building is the process of constructing or structuring a national identity through the utilization of state power. The objective of nation-building is to achieve the unification of the population within the state, thereby ensuring its political stability and viability. According to Harris Mylonas, "Legitimate authority in modern national states is connected to popular rule, to majorities. Nation-building is the process through which these majorities are constructed." In Mylonas's framework, "state elites employ three nation-building policies: accommodation, assimilation, and exclusion."

Nation builders are those members of a state who take the initiative to develop the national community through government programs, including military conscription and national content mass schooling. Nation-building can involve the use of propaganda or major infrastructure development to foster social harmony and economic growth. According to Columbia University sociologist Andreas Wimmer, three factors tend to determine the success of nation-building over the long-run: "the early development of civil-society organisations, the rise of a state capable of providing public goods evenly across a territory, and the emergence of a shared medium of communication."

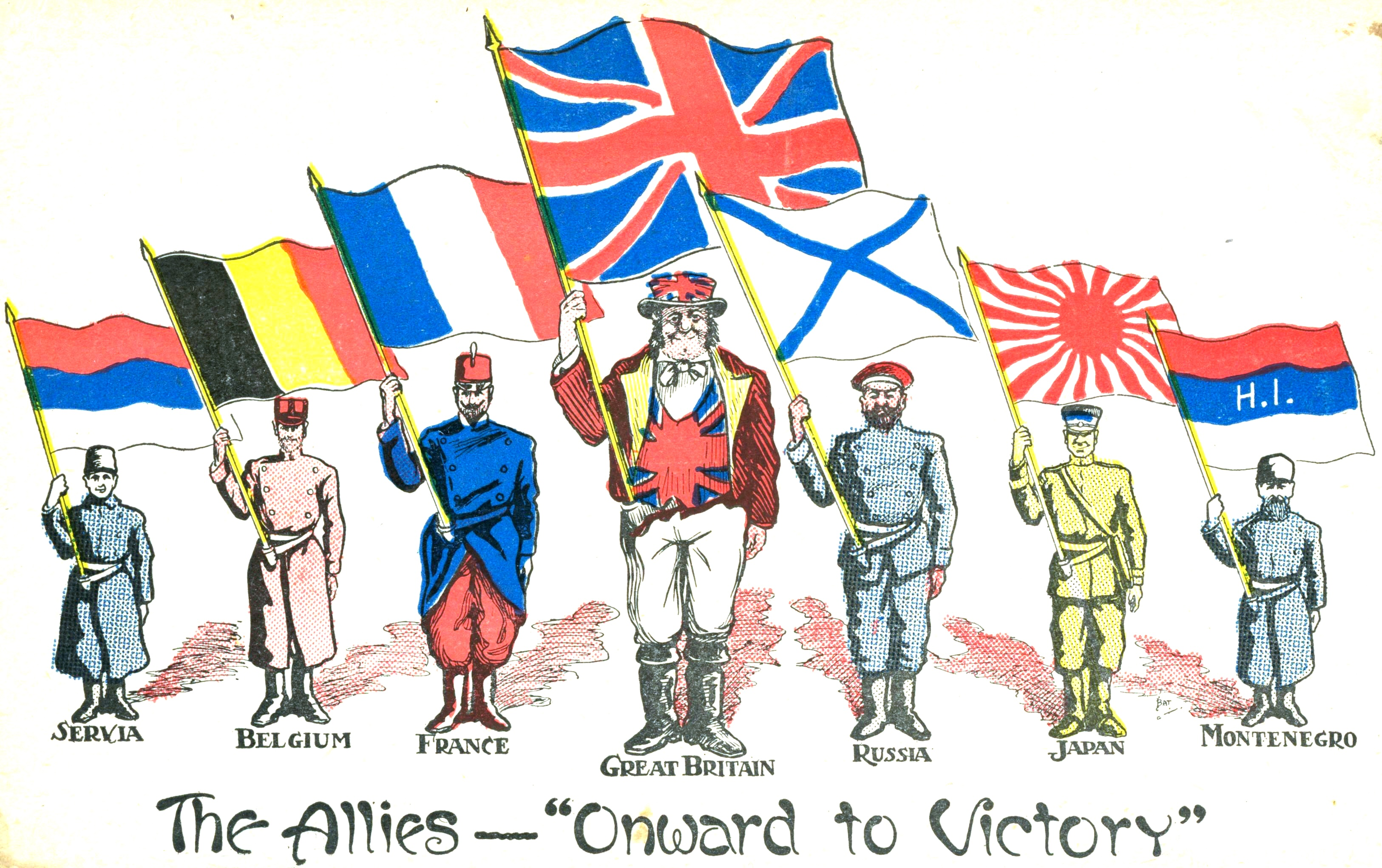
A postcard from 1916 showing national personifications of some of the Allies of World War I, each holding a national flag

== Overview ==
In the modern era, nation-building referred to the efforts of newly independent nations, to establish trusted institutions of national government, education, military defence, diplomacy, finance, taxation, law, and civil rights and liberties. Nation-building can also include attempts to redefine the populace of territories that had been carved out by colonial powers or empires without regard to ethnic, religious, or other boundaries, as in Africa and the Balkans. These reformed states could then become viable and coherent national entities. In Latin America, 19th-century nation-building efforts led by elites not only established institutions like education, military defense, and civil rights but also often reinforced social hierarchies. These new institutions were built with an awareness of the existing class divisions and power dynamics, shaping a national identity that excluded marginalized groups.

Nation-building also includes the creation of national paraphernalia such as national flags, national coats of arms, national anthems, national days, national stadiums, national airlines, national languages, and national myths. At a deeper level, national identity may be deliberately constructed by molding different ethnic groups into a nation, especially since in many newly established states colonial practices of divide and rule had resulted in ethnically heterogeneous populations.

In a functional understanding of nation-building, both economic and social factors are seen as influential. The development of nation-states in different times and places is influenced by differing conditions. It has been suggested that elites and masses in Great Britain, France, and the United States slowly grew to identify with each other as those states were established and that nationalism developed as more people were able to participate politically and to receive public goods in exchange for taxes. The more recent development of nation-states in geographically diverse, postcolonial areas may not be comparable due to differences in underlying conditions.

Many new states were plagued by cronyism (the exclusion of all but friends); corruption which erodes trust; and tribalism (rivalry between tribes within the nation). This sometimes resulted in their near-disintegration, such as the attempt by Biafra to secede from Nigeria in 1970, or the continuing demand of the Somali people in the Ogaden region of Ethiopia for complete independence. The Rwandan genocide, as well as the recurrent problems experienced by the Sudan, can also be related to a lack of ethnic, religious, or racial cohesion within the nation. It has often proved difficult to unite states with similar ethnic but different colonial backgrounds.

Differences in language may be particularly hard to overcome in the process of nation-building. Whereas some consider Cameroon to be an example of success, fractures are emerging in the form of the Anglophone problem. Failures like Senegambia Confederation demonstrate the problems of uniting Francophone and Anglophone territories.

== Nation-building versus state-building ==
Traditionally, there has been some confusion between the use of the term nation-building and that of state-building (the terms are sometimes used interchangeably in North America). Both have fairly narrow and different definitions in political science, the former referring to national identity, the latter to infrastructure, and the institutions of the state. The debate has been clouded further by the existence of two very different schools of thought on state-building. The first (prevalent in the media) portrays state-building as an interventionist action by foreign countries. The second (more academic in origin and increasingly accepted by international institutions) sees state-building as an indigenous process. For a discussion of the definitional issues, see state-building, Carolyn Stephenson's essay, and the papers by Whaites, CPC/IPA or ODI cited below.

The confusion over terminology has meant that more recently, nation-building has come to be used in a completely different context, with reference to what has been succinctly described by its proponents as "the use of armed force in the aftermath of a conflict to underpin an enduring transition to democracy". In this sense nation-building, better referred to as state-building, describes deliberate efforts by a foreign power to construct or install the institutions of a national government, according to a model that may be more familiar to the foreign power but is often considered foreign and even destabilizing. In this sense, state-building is typically characterized by massive investment, military occupation, transitional government, and the use of propaganda to communicate governmental policy.

=== Role of education ===
The expansion of primary school provision is often believed to be a key driver in the process of nation-building. European rulers during the 19th century relied on state-controlled primary schooling to teach their subjects a common language, a shared identity, and a sense of duty and loyalty to the regime. In Prussia, mass primary education was introduced to foster "loyalty, obedience and devotion to the King". These beliefs about the power of education in forming loyalty to the sovereign were adopted by states in other parts of the world as well, in both non-democratic and democratic contexts. Reports on schools in the Soviet Union illustrate the fact that government-sponsored education programs emphasized not just academic content and skills but also taught "a love of country and mercilessness to the enemy, stubbornness in the overcoming of difficulties, an iron discipline, and love of oppressed peoples, the spirit of adventure and constant striving".

== Foreign policy operations ==
=== Germany and Japan after World War II ===
After World War II, the Allied victors engaged in large-scale nation-building with considerable success in Germany. The United States, Britain, and France operated sectors that became West Germany. The Soviet Union operated a sector that became East Germany. In Japan, the victors were nominally in charge but in practice, the United States was in full control, again with considerable political, social, and economic impact.

=== NATO ===
After the collapse of communism in Yugoslavia in 1989, a series of civil wars broke out. Following the Dayton Agreement, also referred to as the Dayton Accords, NATO (the North Atlantic Treaty Organization), and also the European Union, engaged in stopping the civil wars, punishing more criminals, and operating nation-building programs especially in Bosnia and Herzegovina, as well as in Kosovo.

=== Afghanistan ===
==== Soviet efforts ====
Afghanistan was the target for Soviet-style nation-building during the Soviet–Afghan War. However, Soviet efforts bogged down due to Afghan resistance, in which foreign nations (primarily the United States) supported the Afghan mujahideen due to the geopolitics of the Cold War. The Soviet Union ultimately withdrew in 1988, ending the conflict.

==== NATO efforts ====
After the Soviets left, the Taliban established de facto control of much of Afghanistan. It tolerated the Al Qaeda forces that carried out the September 11, 2001 attacks on the United States. NATO responded under US leadership. In December 2001, after the Taliban government was overthrown, the Afghan Interim Administration under Hamid Karzai was formed. The International Security Assistance Force (ISAF) was established by the UN Security Council to help assist the Karzai administration and provide basic security. By 2001, after two decades of civil war and famine, it had the lowest life expectancy, and much of the population were hungry. Many foreign donors—51 in all—started providing aid and assistance to rebuild the war-torn country. For example, Norway's had charge of the province of Faryab. The Norwegian-led Provincial Reconstruction Team had the mission of effecting security, good governance, and economic development, 2005–2012.

The initial invasion of Afghanistan, intended to disrupt Al Qaeda's networks ballooned into a 20 year long nation building project. Frank McKenzie described it as "an attempt to impose a form of government, a state, that would be a state the way that we recognize a state." According to McKenzie, the US "lost track of why we were there". Afghanistan was not "ungovernable", according to the former Marine Corps general, but it was "ungovernable with the Western model that will be imposed on it". He says the gradual shift to nation building put the US "far beyond the scope" of their original mission to disrupt Al Qaeda.
