= Stefan Wolff =

German political scientist

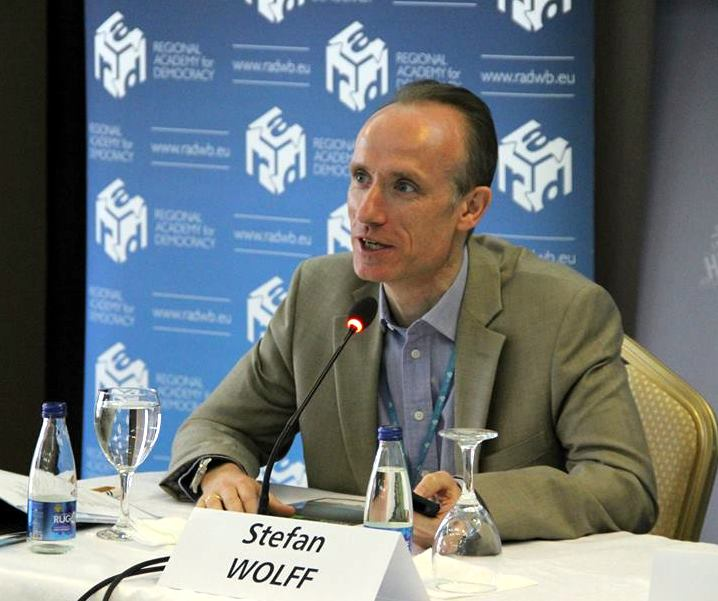
Stefan Wolff (2017)

Stefan Wolff is a German political scientist. He is a specialist in international security, particularly in the management, settlement and prevention of ethnic conflicts. He is currently Professor of International Security at the University of Birmingham in the United Kingdom. Born in 1969, He studied as an undergraduate at the University of Leipzig and holds a Master's degree from Magdalene College, Cambridge, and a PhD from the London School of Economics, where he studied under the supervision of Brendan O'Leary. His doctoral thesis, dated 2000, was titled Managing disputed territories, external minorities and the stability of conflict settlements: A comparative analysis of six cases.

== Research interests ==
Wolff specializes in the prevention, management and settlement of ethnic and religious conflicts and in post-conflict reconstruction in deeply divided and war-torn societies. He has expertise in Northern Ireland, the Balkans and the Middle East, and has also worked on a range of other regions, including Central and Eastern Europe, Africa, and Central and Southeast Asia.

== Career ==
Wolff is a consultant for national and international governmental and non-governmental organizations and the private sector. He is part of a small team of experts studying and developing complex institutional design solutions for self-determination conflicts, funded, among others, by the Carnegie Endowment. He is also coordinating a research group examining the influence of external factors on the development and stability of ethnic autonomy regimes. Other research and consulting projects in this area have been funded by the UK Foreign Office, the Westminster Foundation for Democracy and the British Academy. He is convener of the Political Studies Association's Specialist Group on Ethnopolitics and the European Consortium for Political Research's Standing Group on Security Issues. Wolff is a member of the executive committee of the Ethnicity, Nationalism and Migration Section of the International Studies Association and a member of the executive board of the Association for the Study of Nationalities.

Previously Professor of Political Science at the University of Bath, and chair in Political Science at the University of Nottingham, he is now based in the Department of Political Science and International Studies at the University of Birmingham. Since the academic year 2003/4 he has also held concurrent appointments as Professorial Lecturer in International Relations at the Johns Hopkins University School of Advanced International Studies, Bologna Center, and as Resource Fellow of the Open Society Institute's Academic Fellowship Program. Since 2005, he has also been a Teaching Fellow at the Joint Services Command and Staff College of the British Ministry of Defence. In 2003, he was appointed Senior Non-resident Research Associate at the European Centre for Minority Issues in Flensburg, Germany.

== Selected works ==
=== Monographs ===
- Disputed Territories: The Transnational Dynamics of Ethnic Conflict Settlement (New York and Oxford: Berghahn, 2003, paperback 2004) ISBN 1-57181-657-7
- The German Question. An Analysis with Key Documents (Westport, CT: Praeger, 2003) ISBN 0-275-97269-0
- Germany's Foreign Policy Towards Poland and the Czech Republic: Ostpolitik Revisited (co-authored with Karl Cordell) (London: Routledge, 2005) ISBN 0-415-36974-6
- Ethnic Conflict (Oxford: Oxford University Press, 2006) ISBN 0-19-280587-8

=== Edited volumes ===
- Autonomy, Self-governance and Conflict Resolution: Innovative Approaches to Institutional Design in Divided Societies, ed. by Marc Weller and Stefan Wolff (London: Routledge, 2005) ISBN 0-415-33986-3
- The Ethnopolitical Encyclopaedia of Europe, ed. by Karl Cordell and Stefan Wolff (Basingstoke: Palgrave, 2004) ISBN 0-333-97124-8
- Managing and Settling Ethnic Conflicts. Perspectives on Successes and Failures from Africa, Asia, and Europe, ed. by Ulrich Schneckener and Stefan Wolff (New York and London: Hurst, 2004; US edition: Palgrave) ISBN 1-4039-6623-0
- Minority Languages in Europe: Framework, Status, Prospects, ed. by Stefan Wolff and Gabrielle Hogan-Brun (Basingstoke: Palgrave, 2003) ISBN 1-4039-0396-4
- Peace at Last? The Impact of the Good Friday Agreement on Northern Ireland. With a Foreword by Lord Alderdice, ed. by Jörg Neuheiser and Stefan Wolff (New York and Oxford: Berghahn, 2003, paperback 2004) ISBN 1-57181-658-5
- Coming Home to Germany? The Integration of Ethnic Germans from Central and Eastern Europe in the Federal Republic, ed. by David Rock and Stefan Wolff (New York and Oxford: Berghahn, 2002), ISBN 1-57181-729-8
- German Minorities in Europe: Ethnic Identity and Cultural Belonging, ed. by Stefan Wolff (New York and Oxford: Berghahn, 2000) ISBN 1-57181-504-X
