= Nationalities Papers =

- Discipline: Political science, History, Sociology, Area studies
- Language: English
- Edited by: Harris Mylonas

Publication details
- History: 1972–present
- Publisher: Cambridge University Press (United Kingdom)
- Frequency: Bi-monthly
- Impact factor: 1.6 (2024)

Standard abbreviations
- ISO 4: Natl. Pap.

Indexing
- ISSN: 0090-5992

Links
- Journal homepage

Nationalities Papers is a peer-reviewed academic journal published by Cambridge University Press for the Association for the Study of Nationalities. The editor-in-chief is Harris Mylonas (George Washington University). It publishes articles on nationalism, minorities, and ethnic conflict, with a regional focus on Central and Eastern Europe, the Balkans, the former Soviet Union, Turkey, and Central Asia. The journal is interdisciplinary, with authors from a variety of backgrounds, including history, political science, sociology, anthropology, and literature. Nationalities Papers started in 1972 and currently publishes 6 issues per year.

== Abstracting and indexing ==
Nationalities Papers is abstracted and indexed in International Bibliography of the Social Sciences, Scopus and the Social Sciences Citation Index.

According to the Journal Citation Reports, the journal has a 2024 impact factor of 1.6. In 2024 it ranked 6th out of 538 journals in the History category, 15th out of 39 in Ethnic Studies, 22nd out of 182 in the Area Studies category, and 134th out of 322 in the Political Science category.
