= History of Science (journal) =

- Discipline: History and philosophy of science
- Language: English
- Edited by: Lissa L. Roberts

Publication details
- History: 1962–present
- Publisher: SAGE Publishing (USA)
- Frequency: Quarterly
- Impact factor: 1.037 (2021)

Standard abbreviations
- ISO 4: Hist. Sci.

Indexing
- CODEN: HISCAR
- ISSN: 0073-2753 (print); 1753-8564 (web)
- LCCN: 63002683
- OCLC no.: 60616095

Links
- Journal homepage; Online access; Online archive

History of Science is a peer-reviewed academic journal that covers the history of science, medicine, and technology. The editor-in-chief is Lissa L. Roberts (University of Twente). It was established in 1962 and is published by SAGE Publications.

== Abstracting and indexing ==
The journal is abstracted and indexed in Scopus and the Social Sciences Citation Index. According to the Journal Citation Reports, its 2021 impact factor is 1.0371.
