= Methodological nationalism =

Use of nation-states as the basis of analysis in social science

In social science, methodological nationalism is an intellectual orientation and pattern in scholarly research that conceives of the nation-state as the sole unit of analysis or as a container for social processes. This concept has largely been developed by Andreas Wimmer and Nina Glick Schiller, who specifically define it as "the assumption that the nation/state/society is the natural social and political form of the modern world". Methodological nationalism has been identified in many social science subfields, such as anthropology, sociology, and the interdisciplinary field of migration studies. Methodological nationalism, as a practice within social science, has been further critiqued by scholars such as Saskia Sassen, who contends that the nation-state and its borders are an insufficient unit of analysis and that the national is at times the "terrains of the global".

== Three types of methodological nationalism ==
According to Andreas Wimmer and Nina Glick Schiller, there are three types of methodological nationalism in social science scholarship: ignoring or disregarding the importance of nationalism for modern societies, naturalization, and confining studies to geopolitical boundaries of a particular nation-state. These types may co-occur or occur separately. When they co-occur, they may reinforce each other.

Speranta Dumitru distinguished between other three different versions of methodological nationalism: state-centrism (unjustified supremacy granted to the nation-state), territorialism (understanding space as divided in territories), and groupism (equating society with the nation-state’s society). She argued that methodological nationalism heavily biases the philosophy of migration.

== Methodological nationalism and migration studies ==
Methodological nationalism and its conception of nation-states has been a component of both contemporary and historical methodologies in migration studies, insofar as certain studies have adhered to it or diverged from its theoretical foundations. This adherence has been acknowledged or otherwise criticized in numerous studies. Moreover, the historical prevalence of methodological nationalism within social science has been explored by scholarship which argues that many turn-of-the-century writings on globalization have "conflated the necessary conceptual critique of methodological nationalism with the empirical claim of the nation-state’s diminishing relevance".

On the other hand, research on transnationalism and transmigrants has contemporary examples of divergence and criticism of methodological nationalism as an enduring practice in scholarship. Recent studies in transnationalism have conceived of the nation-state as one agent in a complex relationship with many global actors. Migration Studies that conceive of society as extending beyond national boundaries, then, sever this link between nation-state and society.

Research on transnational Latina motherhood has negotiated issues of the nation-state as well as transnationalism. The conceptual frameworks of power geometries, social location, and geographic scales is positioned to counteract the analytical tendency to fall back on methodological nationalism.

Other scholarly research has combined transnational migration studies and conceptual frameworks such as coloniality of power to avoid methodological nationalism and better account for the intersecting transnational phenomena that constitutes the experiences of transmigrants and better explains the processes of transnational migration.
