= National mysticism =

Form of nationalism which raises the nation to the status of numen or divinity

National mysticism (German: Nationalmystik) or mystical nationalism is a form of nationalism that elevates the nation to the status of numen or divinity. Its best-known instance is Germanic mysticism, which gave rise to occultism under the Third Reich. The idea of the nation as a divine entity was presented by Johann Gottlieb Fichte. National mysticism is closely related to Romantic nationalism, but goes beyond the expounding of romantic sentiment, to a mystical veneration of the nation as a transcendent truth. It often intersects with ethnic nationalism by pseudohistorical assertions about the origins of a given ethnicity.

National mysticism is encountered in many forms of nationalism other than Germanic or Nazi mysticism and expresses itself in the use of occult, pseudoscientific, or pseudohistorical beliefs to support nationalistic claims, often involving unrealistic notions of the antiquity of a nation or any national myth defended as "true" by pseudo-scholarly means.

== See also ==
- National myth
- Christian mysticism
- Religion in national symbols
