= Professionalization and institutionalization of history =

Professionalization and institutionalization of history is a term used in historiography to describe the process of professionalization of the historical discipline with historians becoming professionals through the process of special education and the genesis of historical institutions they founded.

== Professionalization of history ==
During the process of the professionalization of history, being a historian became not only an occupation but a profession. Professionalization of history is the process of acquiring the following characteristics of profession for occupation of historian:

1. prolonged training in definable body of knowledge,
2. a credential system,
3. a code of ethics,
4. a self-government
5. legislated access to particular labour market.

This process results with privileged access to financial and social rewards for its members.

== Institutionalization of history ==
The term institutionalisation is widely used in social theory to refer to the process of embedding something (for example a concept, a social role, a particular value or mode of behaviour) within an organisation, social system, or society as a whole.

== Credential system ==
An undergraduate history degree is often used as a stepping stone to graduate studies in business or law. Many historians are employed at universities and other facilities for post-secondary education. In addition, it is normal for colleges and universities to require a PhD degree for new full-time hires. A scholarly thesis, such as a doctoral dissertation, is now regarded as the baseline qualification for a professional historian. However, some historians still gain recognition based on published (academic) works and the award of fellowships by academic bodies like the Royal Historical Society in the United Kingdom. Publication is increasingly required by smaller schools, so graduate papers become journal articles and PhD dissertations become published monographs. The graduate student experience is difficult—those who finish their doctorate in the United States take on average 8 or more years; funding is scarce except at a few very rich universities. Being a teaching assistant in a course is required in some programs; in others it is a paid opportunity awarded a fraction of the students. Until the 1970s it was rare for graduate programs to teach how to teach; the assumption was that teaching was easy and that learning how to do research was the main mission. A critical experience for graduate students is having a mentor who will provide psychological, social, intellectual and professional support, while directing scholarship and providing an introduction to the profession.

== Labour market ==
Professional historians typically work in colleges and universities, archival centers, government agencies, museums, and as freelance writers and consultants. The job market for new PhDs in history is poor and getting worse, with many relegated to part-time "adjunct" teaching jobs with low pay and no benefits.

== See also ==
- Historian
- Professionalization
- Institutionalization
