= Association for the Study of Nationalities =

Academic association

- Abbreviation: ASN
- Type: Academic association
- Location: New York City, United States
- President: Florian Bieber
- Affiliations: Columbia University
- Website: www.nationalities.org

The Association for the Study of Nationalities (ASN) is an academic association dedicated to the promotion of knowledge and understanding of ethnicity, nationalism, and ethnic conflict broadly, with a particular geographic focus on Central, Eastern, and Southeastern Europe, Russia, Ukraine, the Caucasus, and Eurasia. ASN is based at New York's Columbia University. It publishes Nationalities Papers and, in collaboration with the Specialist Group on Ethnopolitics of the Political Studies Association, Ethnopolitics.

The ASN organises an Annual World Convention at the Harriman Institute, Columbia University and periodic European conferences. ASN awards annually the Joseph Rothschild Prize in Nationalism and Ethnic Studies to an outstanding book published in the previous calendar year on Russia, Eastern Europe or Eurasia in which substantial attention is paid to questions of ethnicity and/or nationalism; Doctoral Student Awards; and the ASN Documentary Film Audience Award.
