= List of scholarly publishing stings =

List of nonsense papers that were accepted by an academic journal or conference

This is a list of scholarly publishing "sting operations" such as the Sokal affair. These are nonsense papers that were accepted by an academic journal or academic conference; the list does not include cases of scientific misconduct. The intent of such publications is typically to expose shortcomings in a journal's peer review process or to criticize the standards of pay-to-publish journals. The ethics of academic stings are disputed, with some arguing that it is morally equivalent to other forms of fraud.

== Notable examples ==
Discipline	Year	Description
Chemistry	2013	"Who's Afraid of Peer Review?": In 2013 John Bohannon wrote in Science about a "sting operation" he conducted in which he submitted "a credible but mundane scientific paper, one with such grave errors that a competent peer reviewer should easily identify it as flawed and unpublishable", to 304 open-access publishers. 157 journals accepted the paper. There have been some objections to the sting's methodology and about what conclusions can be drawn from it.
Computer science	2005	A paper randomly generated by the SCIgen program was accepted without peer-review for presentation at the United States-based World Multiconference on Systemics, Cybernetics and Informatics (WMSCI). None of the three assigned peer-reviewers submitted an opinion about its fidelity, veracity, or accuracy to its subject. The three MIT graduate students who wrote the hoax article said they were unaware of the Sokal affair until after submitting their article. Numerous other papers generated by SCIgen have been published in scientific journals or accepted for presentation at scientific conferences.
Computer science	2013	In December 2013, Navin Kabra, a Pune-based software professional submitted a bogus paper titled "use of cloud-computing and social media to determine box office performance", which was accepted by the Bhubaneswar-based Research Forum for their ICRIEST-AICEEMCS International Conference. The paper's introductory section cautioned that it contained "gibberish" that was auto-generated by software. One section of the paper also includes 19 lines about the 1975 Bollywood film Sholay, and 19 lines from My Cousin Vinny, a 1992 Hollywood film. The incident highlighted a practice where "poor quality papers are accepted from students who are then asked to pay a few thousand rupees to participate in the conferences". The management of the event retracted the paper and apologized publicly. The Secretary in an interview described the acceptance as a human error of the coordinators.
Computer science	2014	In 2014, Australian computer scientist Peter Vamplew submitted a paper to the International Journal of Advanced Computer Technology (IJACT) after being angered that the journal would not take his email off its mailing list. The article, in fact written a decade earlier by David Mazières and Eddie Kohler, was titled "Get me off your fucking mailing list" and consisted of the phrase "Get me off your fucking mailing list" being repeated for the entirety of the article body. The journal requested the researcher to "add some more recent references and do a bit of reformatting" saying that the article's "suitability for the journal was excellent". He was never taken off the mailing list.
Medicine	1974	Elaine Murphy hoaxed the British Medical Journal in 1974 with a case report on the fictional medical condition cello scrotum, purportedly an affliction of the scrotum affecting male players of the cello.
Medicine	2014	In December 2014, Mark Shrime, then a graduate student at Harvard University and now the chair of global surgery at the Royal College of Surgeons in Ireland, used a random text generator to create a gibberish paper entitled "Cuckoo for Cocoa Puffs? The Surgical and Neoplastic Role of Cacao Extract in Breakfast Cereals". He submitted this paper, whose authors were listed as "Pinkerton LeBrain" and Orson Welles, to 37 medical journals. It was accepted into 17 of them.
Medicine	2020	In August 2020, graduate student Mathieu Rebeaud, general practitioner Michaël Rochoy, nuclear medicine intern Valentin Ruggeri and professor of philosophy Florian Cova hoaxed the predatory Asian Journal of Medicine and Health with an article titled "SARS-CoV-2 was Unexpectedly Deadlier than Push-scooters: Could Hydroxychloroquine be the Unique Solution?" The authors list include Emmanuel Macron's dog Nemo.
Philosophy	2015	In April 2015, philosophers Philippe Huneman and Anouk Barberousse published a hoax article entitled "Ontology, Neutrality and the Strive for (non-)Being-Queer" in the journal Badiou Studies. The paper was submitted under the pen name Benedetta Tripodi and was subsequently retracted. The parody was designed to undermine the foundation of Alain Badiou's thought. The hoax was exposed in the French newspaper Libération with the support of Alan Sokal, among others. Answering critics who denounced Huneman and Barberousse's strategy as one of avoidance rather than criticism, the authors of the Libération article pointed to Jonathan Swift's A Modest Proposal to show that publishing satire is sometimes a good way to voice criticism.
Physics	2016	Christoph Bartneck, then an associate professor in Information Technology at New Zealand's University of Canterbury, was invited to submit a paper to the 2016 International Conference on Atomic and Nuclear Physics organised by ConferenceSeries. With little knowledge of nuclear physics, he used iOS's auto-complete function to write the paper, choosing randomly from its suggestions after starting each sentence, and submitted it under the name Iris Pear (a reference to Siri and Apple). A sample sentence: "The atoms of a better universe will have the right for the same as you are the way we shall have to be a great place for a great time to enjoy the day you are a wonderful person to your great time to take the fun and take a great time and enjoy the great day you will be a wonderful time for your parents and kids". The work was accepted within three hours of submission and a conference registration fee of US$1,099 requested. ConferenceSeries is associated with the OMICS Publishing Group, which produces open access journals widely regarded as predatory, and has been accused of moving into "predatory meetings". Bartneck said he was "reasonably certain that this is a money-making conference with little to no commitment to science," given the poor quality of the review process and the high cost of attendance.
Political science	2017	In 2017, geographer Reuben Rose-Redwood sent a pitch to 13 editors of academic journals who supported the publication of Bruce Gilley's paper "The Case for Colonialism". Rose-Redwood proposed a special issue on "The Costs and Benefits of Genocide: Towards a Balanced Debate". Only one editor raised ethical concerns about the proposal.
Psychology	2007	In 2007, Tomasz Witkowski published a fake article in the psychology journal Charaktery, which described a psychotherapeutic method based on a pseudoscientific theory of Rupert Sheldrake. According to Witkowski, the editorial board assisted in adding plagiarized content about Sheldrake to the submission.
Social studies	1996	The Sokal affair: Alan Sokal, a physics professor at New York University and University College London, wrote a paper titled "Transgressing the Boundaries: Towards a Transformative Hermeneutics of Quantum Gravity", which proposed that quantum gravity is a social and linguistic construct. The paper was published in the United States-based Social Text spring/summer 1996 "Science Wars" issue. At that time, the journal did not practice academic peer review, and it did not submit the article for outside review by a physicist. On the day of its publication in May 1996, Sokal revealed in Lingua Franca that the article was a hoax.
Social studies	2017	The "grievance studies" affair (also referred to as the "Sokal Squared" Hoax by the news media): During 2017–2018 Helen Pluckrose, James A. Lindsay and Peter Boghossian wrote 20 hoax articles; at the time the hoax stopped, four papers had been published, three had been accepted but not yet published, seven were under review, and six had been rejected. The papers all focused on what the authors called "grievance studies" related to race, gender, sexuality and other forms of identity. The hoax was revealed and halted after one of the papers in the England-based feminist geography journal Gender, Place and Culture was criticized on social media, and then on Campus Reform, which led a Wall Street Journal editorial writer to investigate and report on it. The paper, which was in the process of being retracted when the Wall Street Journal story broke, referred to dog parks as "petri dishes for canine rape culture". The report also described a paper published in Affilia which contained a reworded excerpt from Mein Kampf.
Social studies	2015	The Sociétés hoax: Using a false identity, Manuel Quinon and Arnaud Saint-Martin submitted an intentionally inept and absurd article on the Autolib', a small rentable car in Paris, to Michel Maffesoli's Sociétés journal. The article was deliberately incoherent and plastered with liberal quotes and references to Maffesoli and other postmodern thinkers. The article was duly "reviewed" by two people, before being accepted and published in Sociétés without any substantial editing.
Theology	2012	Maarten Boudry, a philosopher, in 2012, persuaded two theology conferences to accept abstracts composed of meaningless word salads as a paper.

== Financial stings ==
The definition of a 'sting' can also include a researcher failing to pay publication fees.

Discipline	Year	Description
Medicine	2014	In February 2014, Hatixhe Latifi-Pupovci, a professor from the University of Pristina, submitted a flawed paper to Medical Archives, a journal published in Bosnia and Herzegovina. On 14 April 2014, she received a reminder to pay the publication fee of 250 EUR, which she never did. The paper was already published in the journal four days earlier. In July 2014, the editor of the journal, Izet Masic, published an editorial titled "A New Example of Unethical Behaviour in the Academic Journal Medical Archives," calling out Latifi-Pupovci's actions and declaring that the paper would be retracted.

== See also ==
- List of animals with fraudulent diplomas
- List of hoaxes
- List of religious hoaxes
- List of scientific misconduct incidents
- Predatory open-access publishing
- Parody science
