= SCIgen =

Random text generating software

- Written in: Perl
- Available in: English
- Type: Paper generator
- License: GNU General Public License
- Website: http://pdos.csail.mit.edu/scigen/
- Repository: github.com/strib/scigen

SCIgen is a paper generator that uses context-free grammar to randomly generate nonsense in the form of computer science research papers. Its original data source was a collection of computer science papers downloaded from CiteSeer. All elements of the papers are formed, including graphs, diagrams, and citations. Created by scientists at the Massachusetts Institute of Technology, its stated aim is "to maximize amusement, rather than coherence." Originally created in 2005 to expose the lack of scrutiny of submissions to conferences, the generator subsequently became used, primarily by Chinese academics, to create large numbers of fraudulent conference submissions, leading to the retraction of 122 SCIgen generated papers and the creation of detection software to combat its use.

== Sample output ==
Opening abstract of Rooter: A Methodology for the Typical Unification of Access Points and Redundancy:

Many physicists would agree that, had it not been for congestion control, the evaluation of web browsers might never have occurred. In fact, few hackers worldwide would disagree with the essential unification of voice-over-IP and public/private key pair. In order to solve this riddle, we confirm that SMPs can be made stochastic, cacheable, and interposable.

== Prominent results ==
In 2005, a paper generated by SCIgen, Rooter: A Methodology for the Typical Unification of Access Points and Redundancy, was accepted as a non-reviewed paper to the 2005 World Multiconference on Systemics, Cybernetics and Informatics (WMSCI) and the authors were invited to speak. The authors of SCIgen described their hoax on their website, and it soon received great publicity when picked up by Slashdot. WMSCI withdrew their invitation, but the SCIgen team went anyway, renting space in the hotel separately from the conference and delivering a series of randomly generated talks on their own "track". The organizer of these WMSCI conferences is Professor Nagib Callaos. From 2000 until 2005, the WMSCI was also sponsored by the Institute of Electrical and Electronics Engineers. The IEEE stopped granting sponsorship to Callaos from 2006 to 2008.

Submitting the paper was a deliberate attempt to embarrass WMSCI, which the authors claim accepts low-quality papers and sends unsolicited requests for submissions in bulk to academics. As the SCIgen website states:

One useful purpose for such a program is to auto-generate submissions to conferences that you suspect might have very low submission standards. A prime example, which you may recognize from spam in your inbox, is SCI/IIIS and its dozens of co-located conferences (check out the very broad conference description on the WMSCI 2005 website).

— About SCIgen

Computing writer Stan Kelly-Bootle noted in ACM Queue that many sentences in the "Rooter" paper were individually plausible, which he regarded as posing a problem for automated detection of hoax articles. He suggested that even human readers might be taken in by the effective use of jargon ("The pun on root/router is par for MIT-graduate humor, and at least one occurrence of methodology is mandatory") and attribute the paper's apparent incoherence to their own limited knowledge. His conclusion was that "a reliable gibberish filter requires a careful holistic review by several peer domain experts".

=== Schlangemann ===
The pseudonym "Herbert Schlangemann" was used to publish fake scientific articles in international conferences that claimed to practice peer review. The name is taken from the Swedish short film Der Schlangemann.

- In 2008, in response to a series of Call-for-Paper e-mails, SCIgen was used to generate a false scientific paper titled Towards the Simulation of E-Commerce, using "Herbert Schlangemann" as the author. The article was accepted at the 2008 International Conference on Computer Science and Software Engineering (CSSE 2008), co-sponsored by the IEEE, to be held in Wuhan, China, and the author was invited to be a session chair on grounds of his fictional Curriculum Vitae. The official review comment: "This paper presents cooperative technology and classical Communication. In conclusion, the result shows that though the much-touted amphibious algorithm for the refinement of randomized algorithms is impossible, the well-known client-server algorithm for the analysis of voice-over-IP by Kumar and Raman runs in _(n) time. The authors can clearly identify important features of visualization of DHTs and analyze them insightfully. It is recommended that the authors should develop ideas more cogently, organizes them more logically, and connects them with clear transitions." The paper was available for a short time in the IEEE Xplore Database, but was then removed. The entire story is described in the official "Herbert Schlangemann" blog, and it also received attention in Slashdot and the German-language technology-news site Heise Online.
- In 2009, the same incident happened and Herbert Schlangemann's latest fake paper PlusPug: A Methodology for the Improvement of Local-Area Networks was accepted for oral presentation at the 2009 International Conference on e-Business and Information System Security (EBISS 2009), also co-sponsored by IEEE, to be held again in Wuhan, China.

In all cases, the published papers were withdrawn from the conferences' proceedings, and the conference organizing committee as well as the names of the keynote speakers were removed from their websites.

=== List of works with notable acceptance ===
==== In conferences ====
- Rob Thomas: Rooter: A Methodology for the Typical Unification of Access Points and Redundancy, 2005 for WMSCI (see above)
- Mathias Uslar's paper was accepted to the IPSI-BG conference.
- Professor Genco Gulan published a paper in the 3rd International Symposium of Interactive Media Design.
- A 2013 scientometrics paper demonstrated that at least 85 SCIgen papers have been published by IEEE and Springer. Over 120 SCIgen papers were removed according to this research.

==== In journals ====
- Students at Iran's Sharif University of Technology published a paper in Elsevier's Journal of Applied Mathematics and Computation. The students wrote under the surname "MosallahNejad", which translates literally from Persian language (in spite of not being a traditional Persian name) as "from an Armed Breed". The paper was subsequently removed when the publishers were informed that it was a joke paper.
- Mikhail Gelfand published a translation of the "Rooter" article in the Russian-language Journal of Scientific Publications of Aspirants and Doctorants in August 2008. Gelfand was protesting against the journal, which was apparently not peer-reviewed and was being used by Russian PhD candidates to publish in an "accredited" scientific journal, charging them 4,000 Rubles to do so. The accreditation was revoked two weeks later. (See Dissernet for related information.)
- Springer Science+Business Media and IEEE were also the subject of similar pranks.

=== Spoofing Google Scholar and h-index calculators ===
Refereeing performed on behalf of the Institute of Electrical and Electronics Engineers has also been subject to criticism after fake papers were discovered in conference publications, most notably by Labbé and a researcher using the pseudonym of Schlangemann.

Cyril Labbé from Grenoble University demonstrated the vulnerability of h-index calculations based on Google Scholar output by feeding it a large set of SCIgen-generated documents that were citing each other, effectively an academic link farm, in a 2010 paper. Using this method the author managed to rank "Ike Antkare" ahead of Albert Einstein for instance.

=== 2013 retractions ===
In 2013, over 122 published conference papers created by SCIgen were retracted by Springer and the IEEE. Unlike previous submissions that were intended to be pranks, this submission were largely made by Chinese academics, who were using SCIgen papers to boost their publication record.

=== SciDetect ===
In 2015, SciDetect was released by Springer. This software, developed by Cyril Labbé, is designed to automatically detect papers generated by SCIgen.

=== 2021 report ===
In 2021, a study was published on 243 SCIgen papers that had been published in the academic literature. They found that SCIgen papers made up 75 per million papers (< 0.01%) in information science, and that only a small fraction of the detected papers had been dealt with.

== See also ==
- Academic conference
- Bogdanov affair
- Derailment (thought disorder)
- Grievance studies affair
- Infinite monkey theorem
- List of scholarly publishing hoaxes
- Paper generator
- Parody generator
- Postmodernism Generator
- Sokal affair
- The Engine
- Turing test
- Get me off your fucking mailing list
- Who's Afraid of Peer Review?
