= Shaping Psychology =

2020 book by Tomasz Witkowski

Shaping Psychology: Perspectives on Legacy, Controversy and the Future of the Field
- Book cover
- Author: Tomasz Witkowski
- Language: English
- Publisher: Palgrave Macmillan
- Publication date: 2020
- Media type: Print
- Pages: VIII, 331
- ISBN: 978-3-030-50002-3
- Preceded by: Psychology Led Astray: Cargo Cult in Science and Therapy
- Followed by: Fads, Fakes, and Frauds: Exploding Myths in Culture, Science and Psychology

Shaping Psychology: Perspectives on Legacy, Controversy and the Future of the Field is a 2020 book written by Polish psychologist Tomasz Witkowski. It is a collection of conversations with influential psychologists from the early 21st century, featuring interviews with notable figures who have significantly impacted the field and covering a broad spectrum of specializations from research, mental health, critical psychology, and neuroscience, as well as the open science movement. Interviewees include Elizabeth Loftus, Jerome Kagan, Michael I. Posner, Scott Lilienfeld, Robert Sternberg, Robert Plomin, Susan Blackmore, Joseph E. LeDoux, Noam Chomsky, Roy Baumeister, Erica Burman, Brian Nosek, Vikram Patel, Daniel Kahneman, and Carol Tavris. These experts discuss the controversies, crises, and future prospects of psychology, sharing their views on the challenges in the field, their careers, and their formative experiences.

== Reception ==
In her review for Science-Based Medicine and Skeptical Inquirer, Harriet Hall offered insights into the book, noting:

Tomasz Witkowski's new book [...] provides an intriguing look at the current state of psychology, its problems and possible solutions, and hopes for the future. [...] I have met several of the people Witkowski interviewed, but now I feel as if I have spent more time with them and know them better. And I have learned a lot from them. If you want to meet these psychologists and learn about the current state of psychology, this book is a great way to do it. Witkowski's unique approach has resulted in a very readable, entertaining, and very informative book.

Michael Heap, editor of Skeptical Intelligencer, commented in his review:

Amongst the issues about which Witkowski is most concerned are the quality, utility and validity of much of the research being published nowadays; the 'replication crisis'; the efficacy of many psychotherapeutic practices that psychologists seem willing to embrace; and the failure of psychologists to mount a sufficiently strong challenge to their psychiatric colleagues' fetish for diagnostic labelling. [...] The picture that emerges from the book is quite representative of the discipline as a whole.

In his review of the book for Skeptiker, Rouven Schäfer wrote:

An enlightening journey through the contemporary world of psychology. The book conveys refreshing perspectives and also optimism since it has been stated several times that, especially among young scientists who are still at the beginning of their careers, the awareness of the necessary change is already very pronounced. It remains to be seen whether psychology will burn in the flames of its massive criticism or whether it will rise again like a phoenix from the ashes and armed with better research methods. An unusually impressive reading pleasure that gives you goosebumps at one point or another and provides important impulses.
