= Psychology Led Astray =

2016 book by Tomasz Witkowski

Psychology Led Astray: Cargo Cult in Science and Therapy
- The cover of the book
- Author: Tomasz Witkowski
- Language: English
- Publisher: BrownWalker Press
- Publication date: 2016
- Media type: Print
- Pages: 278
- ISBN: 978-1-62734-609-2
- Preceded by: Psychology Gone Wrong: The Dark Sides of Science and Therapy
- Followed by: Shaping Psychology: Perspectives on Legacy, Controversy and the Future of the Field

Psychology Led Astray: Cargo Cult in Science and Therapy is a book written by Tomasz Witkowski and published in 2016.

== Outline ==
Part One, comprising chapters 1 through 6, seeks to answer the question about the reliability of psychology as a science. Part Two, comprising chapters 7 through 10, presents pseudo-scientific concepts in psychotherapy as a kind of uncontrollable experiment on humans. Part Three, comprising chapters 11 through 17, examines a range of dubious, unsupported, and discredited (though still thriving) treatments and therapeutic practices and diagnostic categories devoted to children's problems and needs (e.g., educational kinesiology, attachment therapy, trauma debriefing, Facilitated Communication, Dolphin Therapy). The book ends with a letter to Richard Feynman, chastising him for calling the whole field a cargo cult. Witkowski emphasizes examples of good science in psychology that have had demonstrable benefits for society.

== Reception ==
Writing a review for Science-Based Medicine, Hall wrote: "Witkowski has written a new book that is certain to ruffle a lot of feathers. He uncovers cargo cult practices in psychology, unmasking therapies that are devoid of science, dangerous, and even cruel, especially those directed at children. Even if you don't agree with calling these travesties of science cargo cults, it will make you wonder which other generally-accepted psychological principles and therapies are based on good science."

Michael Heap, reviewer of the book, called the book "a well-written, readable and thoroughly researched book. ... The importance of its subject matter is difficult to overstate. Anyone who is concerned, however remotely, with the study of human psychology and the treatment of psychological difficulties and disorders (and this includes potential patients and their families – i.e. just about anyone) should familiarise themselves with the information in this book."

Rouven Schäfer, in the Skeptiker, wrote that "the author is clearly interested in an evidence-based psychology as the next development step of this rather young science. Many people wouldn't approve of his criticism, but Witkowski's strength lies in questioning popular assumptions on top of a high level of reflectivity. Well-researched, skeptical and enjoyable to read."
