= Psychology Gone Wrong =

2015 book written by Tomasz Witkowski and Maciej Zatonski

Psychology Gone Wrong: The Dark Sides of Science and Therapy
- The cover of the book
- Author: Tomasz Witkowski and Maciej Zatonski
- Language: English
- Publisher: BrownWalker Press
- Publication date: 2015
- Media type: Print
- Pages: 306
- ISBN: 978-1-62734-528-6
- Followed by: Psychology Led Astray: Cargo Cult in Science and Therapy

Psychology Gone Wrong: The Dark Sides of Science and Therapy is a 2015 book written by Tomasz Witkowski and Maciej Zatonski.

It covers mistakes, frauds and abuses of academic psychology, psychotherapy, and psycho-business. In the book the authors review the history of fraudulent research and questionable research practices; the willingness of many psychologists to embrace pseudoscientific ideas and practices (psychoanalysis, recovered-memory therapy, projective testing, neuro-linguistic programming (NLP), etc.), exaggerated claims for the efficacy of psychological interventions, and so on. In each case the authors support their thesis with abundant references.

== Outline of the book ==
Part one of the book, chapters 1 through 7, seeks to demonstrate and to analyse flaws of the academic psychology and its impact on reality. Part two, chapters 8 through 15 presents pseudoscientific concepts in psychotherapy. Part three, chapters 16 through 19 examines problems of psycho-business.

=== Part I: Fraudsters in the Temple of Science: Some Sins of Academic Psychology ===
The authors describe how disasters of social control like forced sterilizations and uncritical application of questionable IQ tests were instigated by psychologists who relied on their own flawed thinking rather than on empirical evidence from scientific studies. They tell stories about researchers who lied, plagiarized, distorted, falsified or even fabricated data, and got away with committing outright fraud over and over again. In some cases fraudulent studies were accepted as gospel and became the basis for ill-advised treatments. The authors argue for transparency in research and show how difficult it is for others to obtain the raw data from studies even when the researchers say they are willing to provide it. They offer proposed solutions to increase transparency and promote data sharing. They discuss problems with peer review, editorial policy, poor research design, non-publication of negative studies, and failure to replicate positive studies. They show how these have created a situation where psychological theories are virtually unkillable. They also show how study results can get distorted and changed in re-telling. At the end of this part they uncover social control problems in the scientific community.

=== Part II: Conquering Patients’ Souls – Sins of Psychotherapists ===
In the next chapters the authors analyze several pseudoscientific concepts in psychotherapy. The first is devoted to psychoanalysis. Investigation has shown that Sigmund Freud falsified or fabricated the details of most cases he used to build his theory. His approach was not scientific. He never tested his ideas with experiments that might have falsified his beliefs, and he ignored facts that contradicted them. Many of his supposed original ideas came from other authors. When tested, psychoanalysis was shown to be less effective than placebo. Its theories have been disproven. Yet it persists in popular opinion as one of the primary canons of practicing psychology. In the next chapter Witkowski and Zatonski provide ample evidence to debunk these myths about childhood experiences:

- Personality is formed by early childhood experiences.
- Mental disorders are caused by early childhood experiences.
- Effective psychotherapy depends on the reconstruction of childhood experiences.

In the chapter 10 the authors show how delving into childhood memories causes serious problems, and has led to terrible abuses such as the recovered memory movement. The idea of repressed and recovered memories is presented as a creative invention of therapists. Patients are easily duped because it provides a convenient scapegoat to explain their problems and relieves them of responsibility for their inability to cope with their lives. Academic psychologists bear much of the blame for failing to subject pop trends to empirical verification and failing to speak out and denounce false theories. Chapter 11 presents an unusual perspective on the psychotherapy. Psychotherapeutic interventions in general have been remarkably unsuccessful. Only one of the many varieties of psychotherapy is supported by acceptable evidence: cognitive behavioral therapy. There is no correlation between a therapist’s training or experience and patient outcomes. Amateurs get equal results. The benefits of psychotherapy may be no better than the benefits of talking to a friend; in a sense, psychotherapists are paid to act as friends, which could be considered a sort of prostitution. Chapter 12 deals with the harms of therapy. Therapy can do real harm and can lead to suicide. It encourages dependence, false optimism, and externalized responsibility. Not one study of AA has ever shown it superior to any other approach for treating alcohol abuse, and in fact untreated patients have similar or better outcomes. In chapter 13 the authors ask: What are the alternatives for psychotherapy? Can we replace psychotherapy with something else? Can a new “salutogenic” paradigm replace the pathogenic paradigm by focusing on human resilience and coping abilities? Mental health is characterized by commitment (a sense of purpose), by the belief that you have some control over your life, and by the understanding that change, not stability, is a natural element of reality. Hardiness is largely genetic but can be developed by exposure to stress.

=== Part III: Beyond Control: Psychobusiness ===
The authors devote the 16th chapter to illustrate how psycho-business works. The next is entirely devoted to neurolinguistic programming (NLP), showing how it developed and flourished, how the scientific literature served as support for a pseudoscientific business, how it infiltrated academia, and how the scientific community failed to denounce it. In chapter 19, one of the authors describes how he perpetrated a psychological Sokal Hoax. He got a bogus article published about a new therapy he invented based on Rupert Sheldrake’s pseudoscientific concept of “morphogenetic fields.” It shows how easily he could have marketed his new therapy and become rich at the expense of patients. In the concluding chapter, the authors describe the strategies employed by scientists with regard to pseudoscience.

== Reception ==
Writing reviews for Science-Based Medicine and the Skeptical Inquirer, Harriet Hall gave her insight regarding the book. She concluded: “This is a well-referenced, well-reasoned book that is chock-full of information about the state of psychology today. It exposes a lot of dirty linen that would be of interest to any reader. I agree with James Alcock, Professor of Psychology at York University, whose back-cover blurb says it should be required reading for every psychologist and psychology student and anyone contemplating psychotherapy.”

Editor of the Skeptical Intelligencer, Michael Heap states in his review that, “For professional psychologists, students and anyone who needs a working knowledge of academic and applied psychology (which includes all skeptics) this is an important book and I thoroughly recommend it.”

Rouven Schäfer reviewing the book in the Skeptiker writes that "Hard, but factually, the authors go to court with some developments in psychology. Their concern is cleaning up the house of psychological science. Thus, this book also serves as a declaration of love to science. It enriches the assortment of the skeptical book market, and even though it doesn’t always present solutions, it helps raise the reader’s awareness of errors and undesirable developments.”
