= Fads, Fakes, and Frauds =

2022 book by Tomasz Witkowski

Fads, Fakes, and Frauds: Exploding Myths in Culture, Science and Psychology
- The cover of the book
- Author: Tomasz Witkowski
- Language: English
- Publisher: Universal Publishers (United States)
- Publication date: 2022
- Media type: Print
- Pages: 234
- ISBN: 9781627344005
- Preceded by: Shaping Psychology: Perspectives on Legacy, Controversy and the Future of the Field

Fads, Fakes, and Frauds: Exploding Myths in Culture, Science and Psychology is a 2022 book written by Tomasz Witkowski and foreworded by Roy Baumeister.

== Outline ==
The book consists of 18 critical essays, organized into five distinct parts. The initial part, Under the Veneer of Reality, explores the paradoxical nature of human diversity and similarity, the significance of perspective in perceiving reality, the impact of contemporary gurus, and the culture of victims. The next part, On the Edge of Life and Death, delves into the concept of suicide as an expression of ultimate freedom, evaluates the efficacy and evolution of suicide prevention strategies, and scrutinizes societal perceptions of different forms of suicide. This part concludes with a discussion on the principle of presumed innocence. The third part, Behind the Altar of Science, examines the interplay between wisdom and authority, the crucial role of unambiguity in scientific discourse, and the value of a reductive approach in epistemology. The fourth part, Under the Scenery of Pop Psychology, encompasses essays addressing misconceptions about contemporary views on loneliness, embodied cognition, misunderstandings of placebo and nocebo effects, and the controversy surrounding Hans Eysenck's fabricated research on lung cancer prevalence. The final part, Behind the Facade of Therapeutic Culture, is dedicated to assessing the efficacy of psychotherapy, highlighting the lack of research on its adverse effects, and examining the conflicts of interest among its practitioners. The concluding essay focuses on the ethical dilemmas in psychotherapy, especially analyzing therapists' adherence to the principle of primum non nocere (first, do no harm).

== Reception ==
Swedish psychologist and therapist Teddy Winroth wrote in his review for FOLKVETT:

I appreciate the book as a healthy reckoning with our own corps. I have seen with my own eyes some of the scandals and system errors the book describes. If I had to decide, at least one of Witkowski’s books would have been mandatory reading for all psychology programs in Sweden.

Editor of the Skeptical Intelligencer, Michael Heap wrote in his review:

Aptly titled Fads, Fakes, and Frauds, in his book Dr Witkowski provides us with a series of hard hitting, highly skeptical essays on a wide range of issues of contemporary concern. These include our understanding and treatment of mental health problems, including suicide and self-harm; placebo and nocebo in medicine; the quality of scientific research; loneliness; victimization; and criminal justice. His aim is to demonstrate how we have come to understand and represent these issues in ways that are counterproductive rather than beneficial, and to highlight the muddling of fact, misrepresentation and self-interested fiction in conventional discourse and social policy. An informed and highly readable account, the book comes at a time when its message could not be more relevant.

Rouven Schäfer reviewing the book in the Skeptiker wrote:

Many cultural achievements are more or less in conflict with reality, since distortions of perception and errors in judgment are part of human nature. Even cherished assumptions often turn out to be illusory. If you want to look behind the facade of a seemingly consistent perception of the world then I would like to recommend these 18 excellent essays in this book. The author takes you on an entertaining and exciting journey of critical thinking, highlighting numerous socially relevant issues. A real reading pleasure for open-minded people.

In her review for the Science-Based Medicine and Skeptical Inquirer, Harriet Hall wrote:

You may not agree with everything Witkowski says, but you would do well to follow his example and question everything you have been taught. Ideas that everyone assumes are true may not be. He asks for evidence, and he provides references. He writes well, tells good stories, and offers examples that will make you think. Readers will be challenged and may be provoked to change their minds about things they once took for granted. Prepare to have your apple cart upset; you may need to pick up some apples.
