= Mark V. Shaney =

System which created Usenet posts using Markov chains

Mark V. Shaney is a synthetic Usenet user whose postings in the net.singles newsgroups were generated by Markov chain techniques, based on text from other postings. The username is a play on the words "Markov chain". Many readers were fooled into thinking that the quirky, sometimes uncannily topical posts were written by a real person.

The system was designed by Rob Pike with coding by Bruce Ellis. Don P. Mitchell wrote the Markov chain code, initially demonstrating it to Pike and Ellis using the Tao Te Ching as a basis. They chose to apply it to the net.singles netnews group.

The program is fairly simple. It ingests the sample text (the Tao Te Ching, or the posts of a Usenet group) and creates a massive list of every sequence of three successive words (triplet) which occurs in the text. It then chooses two words at random, and looks for a word which follows those two in one of the triplets in its massive list. If there is more than one, it picks at random (identical triplets count separately, so a sequence which occurs twice is twice as likely to be picked as one which only occurs once). It then adds that word to the generated text.

Then, in the same way, it picks a triplet that starts with the second and third words in the generated text, and that gives a fourth word. It adds the fourth word, then repeats with the third and fourth words, and so on. This algorithm is called a third-order Markov chain (because it uses sequences of three words).

== Examples ==
A classic example, from 1984, originally sent as a mail message, later posted to net.singles is reproduced here:

>From mvs Fri Nov 16 17:11 EST 1984 remote from alice

It looks like Reagan is going to say? Ummm... Oh yes, I was looking for. I'm so glad I remembered it. Yeah, what I have wondered if I had committed a crime. Don't eat with your assessment of Reagon and Mondale. Up your nose with a guy from a firm that specifically researches the teen-age market. As a friend of mine would say, "It really doesn't matter"... It looks like Reagan is holding back the arms of the American eating public have changed dramatically, and it got pretty boring after about 300 games.

People, having a much larger number of varieties, and are very different from what one can find in Chinatowns across the country (things like pork buns, steamed dumplings, etc.) They can be cheap, being sold for around 30 to 75 cents apiece (depending on size), are generally not greasy, can be adequately explained by stupidity. Singles have felt insecure since we came down from the Conservative world at large. But Chuqui is the way it happened and the prices are VERY reasonable.

Can anyone think of myself as a third sex. Yes, I am expected to have. People often get used to me knowing these things and then a cover is placed over all of them. Along the side of the $$ are spent by (or at least for ) the girls. You can't settle the issue. It seems I've forgotten what it is, but I don't. I know about violence against women, and I really doubt they will ever join together into a large number of jokes. It showed Adam, just after being created. He has a modem and an autodial routine. He calls my number 1440 times a day. So I will conclude by saying that I can well understand that she might soon have the time, it makes sense, again, to get the gist of my argument, I was in that (though it's a Republican administration).

_-_-_-_-Mark

Other quotations from Mark's Usenet posts are:

- "I spent an interesting evening recently with a grain of salt." (Alternatively reported as "While at a conference a few weeks back, I spent an interesting evening with a grain of salt.")
- "I hope that there are sour apples in every bushel." (see also sour grapes)

== History ==
In The Usenet Handbook Mark Harrison writes that after September 1981, students joined Usenet en masse, "creating the USENET we know today: endless dumb questions, endless idiots posing as savants, and (of course) endless victims for practical jokes." In December, Rob Pike created the netnews group net.suicide as prank, "a forum for bad jokes". Some users thought it was a legitimate forum, some discussed "riding motorcycles without helmets". At first, most posters were "real people", but soon "characters" began posting. Pike created a "vicious" character named Bimmler. At its peak, net.suicide had ten frequent posters; nine were "known to be characters." But ultimately, Pike deleted the newsgroup because it was too much work to maintain; Bimmler messages were created "by hand". The "obvious alternative" was software, running on a Bell Labs computer created by Bruce Ellis, based on the Markov code by Don Mitchell, which became the online character Mark V. Shaney.

Kernighan and Pike listed Mark V. Shaney in the acknowledgements in The Practice of Programming, noting its roots in Mitchell's markov, which, adapted as shaney, was used for "humorous deconstructionist activities" in the 1980s.

Dewdney pointed out "perhaps Mark V. Shaney's magnum opus: a 20-page commentary on the deconstructionist philosophy of Jean Baudrillard" directed by Pike, with assistance from Henry S. Baird and Catherine Richards, to be distributed by email. The piece was based on Jean Baudrillard's "The Precession of Simulacra", published in Simulacra and Simulation (1981).

== Reception ==
The program was discussed by A. K. Dewdney in the Scientific American "Computer Recreations" column in 1989, by Penn Jillette in his PC Computing column in 1991, and in several books, including the Usenet Handbook, Bots: the Origin of New Species, Hippo Eats Dwarf: A Field Guide to Hoaxes and Other B.S., and non-computer-related journals such as Texas Studies in Literature and Language.

Dewdney wrote about the program's output, "The overall impression is not unlike what remains in the brain of an inattentive student after a late-night study session. Indeed, after reading the output of Mark V. Shaney, I find ordinary writing almost equally strange and incomprehensible!" He noted the reactions of newsgroup users, who have "shuddered at Mark V. Shaney's reflections, some with rage and others with laughter:"

The opinions of the new net.singles correspondent drew mixed reviews. Serious users of the bulletin board's services sensed satire. Outraged, they urged that someone "pull the plug" on Mark V. Shaney's monstrous rantings. Others inquired almost admiringly whether the program was a secret artificial intelligence project that was being tested in a human conversational environment. A few may even have thought that Mark V. Shaney was a real person, a tortured schizophrenic desperately seeking a like-minded companion.

Concluding, Dewdney wrote, "If the purpose of computer prose is to fool people into thinking that it was written by a sane person, Mark V. Shaney probably falls short."

A 2012 article in Observer compared Mark V. Shaney's "strangely beautiful" postings to the Horse_ebooks account on Twitter and music reviews at Pitchfork, saying that "this mash-up of gibberish and human sentiment" is what "made Mark V. Shaney so endlessly fascinating".

== See also ==
- Turing test
- Dissociated press
- On the Internet, nobody knows you're a dog
- Parody generator
