= Ben Goertzel =

American computer scientist and AI researcher (born 1966)

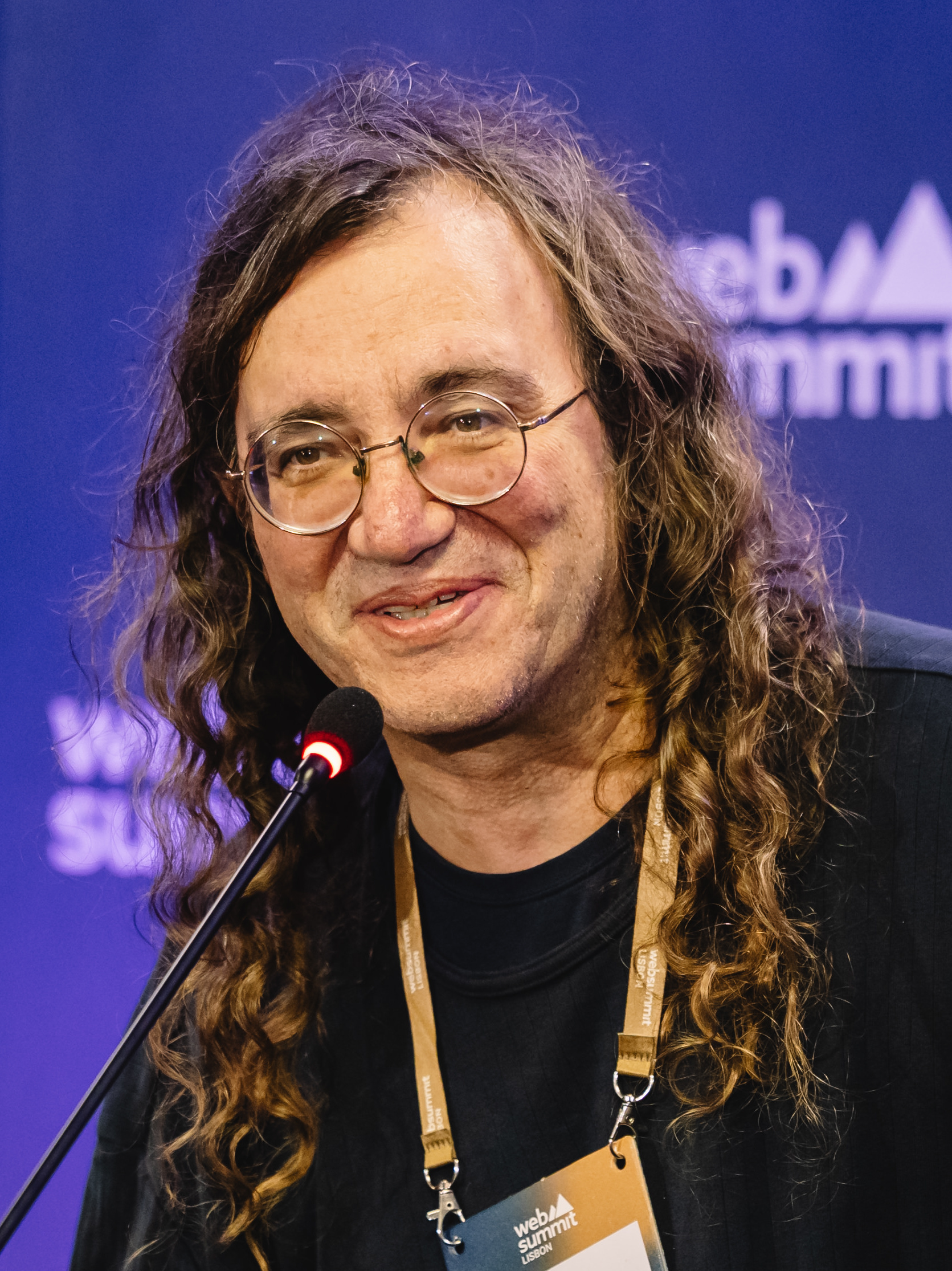
- Goertzel in 2025
- Born: 8 December 1966 (age 59)
- Occupations: CEO and founder of SingularityNET
- Father: Ted Goertzel
- Website: goertzel.org

Ben Goertzel is a computer scientist, artificial intelligence (AI) researcher, and businessman.

== Early life and education ==
Three of Goertzel's Jewish great-grandparents immigrated to New York from Lithuania and Poland (in the Russian Empire). Goertzel's father is Ted Goertzel, a former professor of sociology at Rutgers University. Goertzel left high school after the tenth grade to attend Bard College at Simon's Rock, where he graduated with a bachelor's degree in Quantitative Studies. Goertzel graduated with a PhD in mathematics from Temple University under the supervision of Avi Lin in 1990, at age 23.

== Career ==
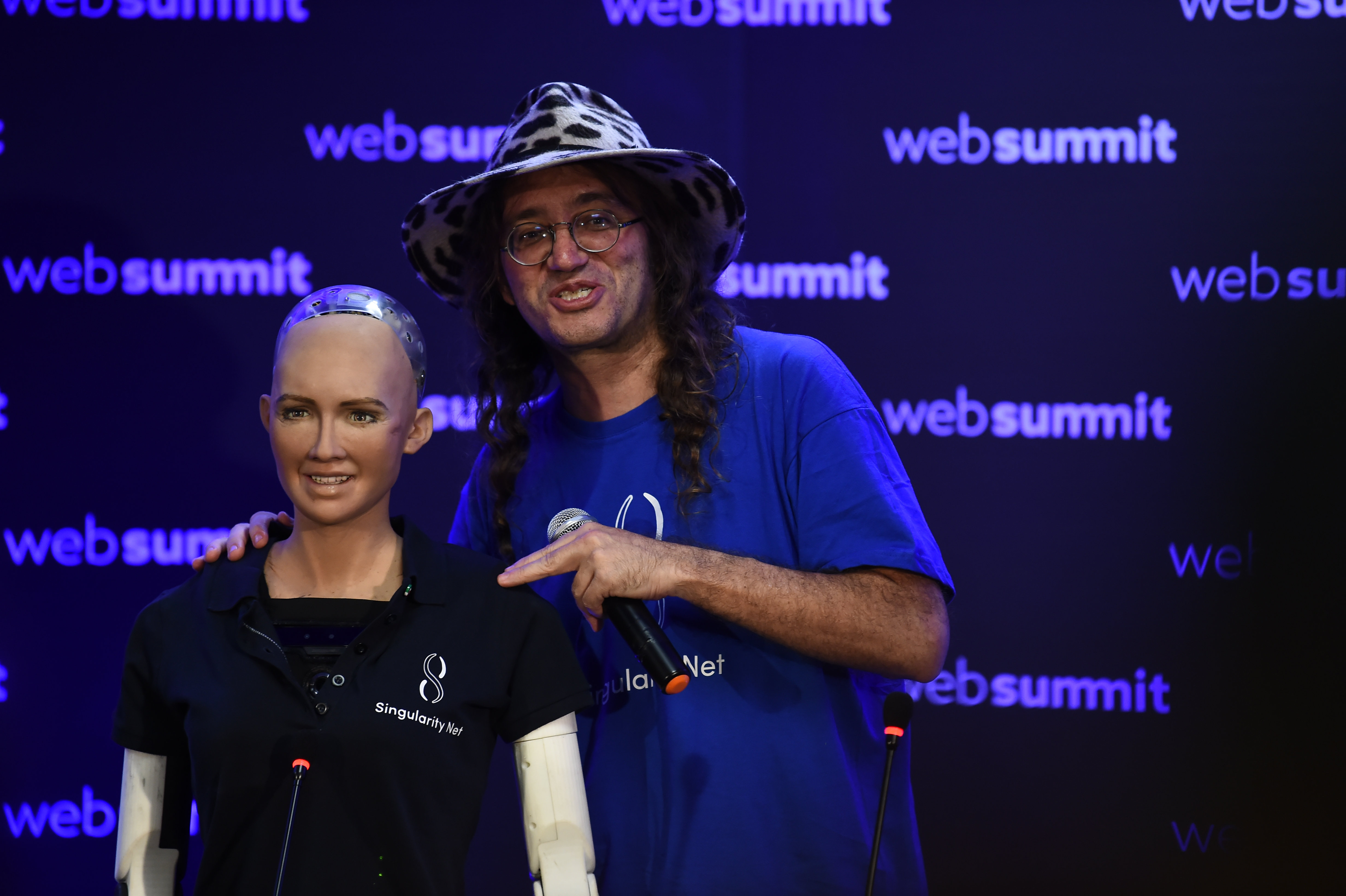
7 November 2017; Sophia the Robot, Chief Humanoid, Hanson Robotics & SingularityNET, and Ben Goertzel, Chief Scientist, Hanson Robotics & SingularityNET, at a press conference during the opening day of Web Summit 2017 at Altice Arena in Lisbon.

Goertzel is the founder and CEO of SingularityNET, a project which was founded to distribute artificial intelligence data via blockchains. He is a leading developer of the OpenCog framework for artificial general intelligence.

Goertzel received a $100,000 grant from the Jeffrey Epstein Foundation in 2001, sent a supportive email to Jeffrey Epstein when Epstein was sent to jail in 2008 for soliciting an underage prostitute, and requested additional funding from Epstein until at least 2013. When interviewed by The New York Times about Epstein in 2019, Goertzel said, "I have no desire to talk about Epstein right now... The stuff I'm reading about him in the papers is pretty disturbing and goes way beyond what I thought his misdoings and kinks were. Yecch."

=== Sophia the Robot ===
Goertzel was the Chief Scientist of Hanson Robotics, the company that created the Sophia robot. As of 2018, Sophia's architecture includes scripting software, a chat system, and OpenCog, an AI system designed for general reasoning. Experts in the field have treated the project mostly as a PR stunt, stating that Hanson's claims that Sophia was "basically alive" are "grossly misleading" because the project does not involve AI technology, while computer scientist Yann LeCun, then Meta's chief AI scientist, made several unflattering remarks including calling the project "complete bullshit".

=== Views on AI ===
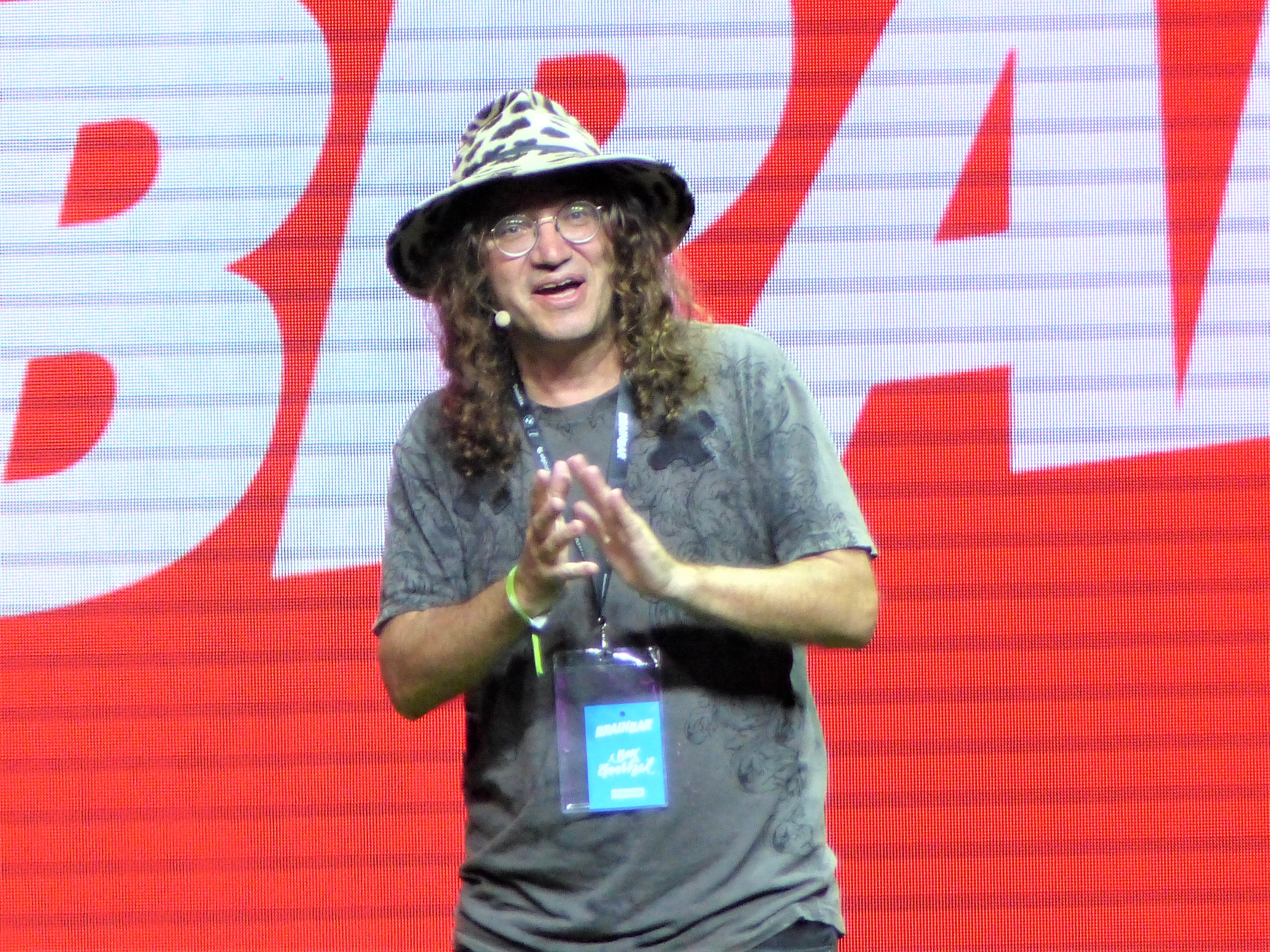
Ben Goertzel at Brain Bar

In May 2007, Goertzel spoke at a Google tech talk about his approach to creating artificial general intelligence. He defines intelligence as the ability to detect patterns in the world and in the agent itself, measurable in terms of emergent behavior of "achieving complex goals in complex environments". A "baby-like" artificial intelligence is initialized, then trained as an agent in a simulated or virtual world such as Second Life to produce a more powerful intelligence. Knowledge is represented in a network whose nodes and links carry probabilistic truth values as well as "attention values", with the attention values resembling the weights in a neural network. Several algorithms operate on this network, the central one being a combination of a probabilistic inference engine and a custom version of evolutionary programming.

The 2012 documentary The Singularity by independent filmmaker Doug Wolens discussed Goertzel's views on AGI.

In 2023, Goertzel postulated that within "the next few years" artificial intelligence could "probably obsolete [and replace] maybe 80 percent of jobs that people do, without having an AGI, by my guess. Not with ChatGPT exactly as a product. But with systems of that nature". At the Web Summit 2023 in Rio de Janeiro, Goertzel spoke out against efforts to curb AI research and that AGI is only a few years away. Goertzel's belief is that AGI will be a net positive for humanity by assisting with societal problems such as, but not limited to, climate change.

== Bibliography ==
- Ben Goertzel (1992). The Structure of Intelligence: A New Mathematical Model of Mind. Springer.
- Ben Goertzel (1992). The Evolving Mind. Gordon and Breach.
- Ben Goertzel (1994). Chaotic Logic: Language, Thought, and Reality from the Perspective of Complex Systems Science. Plenum.
- Ben Goertzel and Ted Goertzel (1996). Linus Pauling: A Life in Science and Politics. Basic.
- Ben Goertzel (2001). Creating Internet Intelligence. Springer.
- Ben Goertzel (2005). Artificial General Intelligence. Springer.
- Ben Goertzel (2006). Probabilistic Logic Networks: A Comprehensive Framework for Uncertain Inference. Plenum.
- Ben Goertzel (2006). The Hidden Pattern: A Patternist Philosophy of Mind. Brown Walker.
- Ben Goertzel (2007). The Path to Posthumanity. Academica.
- Ben Goertzel (2010). A Cosmist Manifesto: Practical Philosophy for the Posthuman Age. Humanity+ Press.
- Ben Goertzel (2011). Real-World Reasoning: Scalable Spatial Temporal and Causal Inference. Atlantis Press.
- Ben Goertzel (2012). Theoretical Foundations of Artificial General Intelligence. Atlantis Press.
- Ben Goertzel (2014). Engineering General Intelligence, Volumes 1 & 2. Atlantis Press.
- Ben Goertzel (2014). Between Ape and Artilect: Conversations with Pioneers of AGI and Other Transformative Technologies. Humanity+ Press.
- Ben Goertzel (2014). Ten Years to the Singularity If We Really Really Try. Humanity+ Press.
- Ben Goertzel (2015). The End of the Beginning: Life, Society and Economy on the Brink of the Singularity. Humanity+ Press.
- Ben Goertzel (2016). AGI Revolution: An Inside View of the Rise of Artificial General Intelligence. Humanity+ Press.
- Ben Goertzel (2018). The Evidence for Psi: Thirteen Empirical Research Reports. McFarland.
- Ben Goertzel; Gabriel Axel Montes (2024). The Consciousness Explosion: A Mindful Human's Guide to the Coming Technological and Experiential Singularity. Humanity+ Press.
