= Paper generator =

Software to create fake academic articles

A fake paper Towards the Construction of the Location-Identity Split created with SCIgen.

A paper generator is computer software that composes scholarly papers in the style of those that appear in academic journals or conference proceedings. Typically, the generator uses technical jargon from the field to compose sentences that are grammatically correct and seem erudite but are actually nonsensical. The prose is supported by tables, figures, and references that may be valid in themselves, but are randomly inserted rather than relevant.

Examples include the Postmodernism Generator, snarXiv and SCIgen. The latter has been used to generate many computer science papers that were accepted for publication.

== See also ==
- Sokal affair
- List of scholarly publishing stings
