= Parody generator =

Software that generates nonsensical text

Parody generators are computer programs which generate text that is syntactically correct, but usually meaningless, often in the style of a technical paper or a particular writer. They are also called travesty generators and random text generators.

Their purpose is often satirical, intending to show that there is little difference between the generated text and real examples.

Many work by using techniques such as Markov chains to reprocess real text examples; alternatively, they may be hand-coded. Generated texts can vary from essay length to paragraphs and tweets. (The term "quote generator" can also be used for software that randomly selects real quotations.)

== Design ==
Parody generators usually combine knowledge about a specific topic with more general patterns of language use. Research on computer-generated humour explains that these programs are designed to imitate and exaggerate particular styles or subjects, while also using basic elements of humour that work across many kinds of parody. Because these humour techniques are not limited to a single topic, ideas developed for one parody generator can often be reused in others.

== Examples ==
- Dissociated press, an implementation of a Markov chaining algorithm
- Postmodernism Generator, generates essays in the style of post-structuralism
- SCIgen, generates nonsensical computer science research papers

== See also ==
- Chatterbot
- Cleverbot
- Filler text, meaningless text used as an example
- Natural language generation
- Paper generator
- Large language model
- Chatbot
