= BMJ Global Health =

- Discipline: Healthcare
- Language: English
- Edited by: Mark G. Shrime

Publication details
- History: 2016–present
- Publisher: BMJ Publishing Group
- Open access: Yes
- Impact factor: 6.1 (2024)

Standard abbreviations
- ISO 4: BMJ Glob. Health

Indexing
- ISSN: 2059-7908

Links
- Journal homepage; Online archive

BMJ Global Health is a peer-reviewed open-access medical journal which publishes research articles and reviews about global health issues. It was established in 2016 and is published by the BMJ Publishing Group. As of 2024, its editor-in-chief is Mark G. Shrime.

== Abstracting and indexing ==
The journal is abstracted and indexed in:

- Biological Abstracts
- BIOSIS Previews
- Current Contents
- MEDLINE/PubMed
- Science Citation Index Expanded
- Scopus

According to the Journal Citation Reports, the journal has a 2024 impact factor of 6.1.
