= Postmodernism Generator =

Computer program

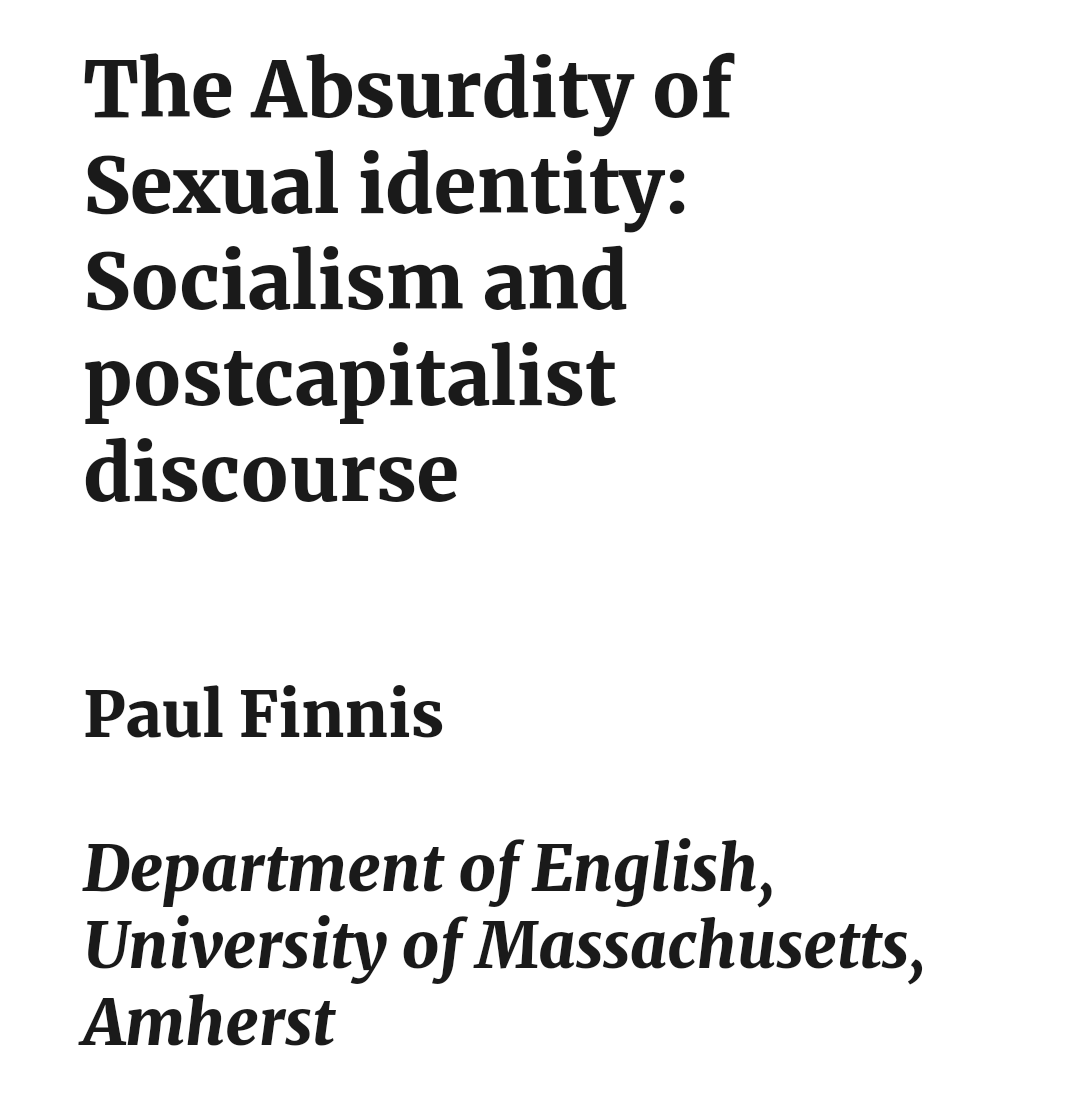
- An example of a randomly generated title.
- Website type: Parody generator
- Available in: English
- Owner: Andrew C. Bulhak
- Creator: Andrew C. Bulhak
- Website: Postmodernism Generator
- Commercial: No
- Launched: 1996
- Current status: Active

The Postmodernism Generator is a computer program that automatically produces "close imitations" of postmodernist writing. It was written in 1996 by Andrew C. Bulhak of Monash University using the Dada Engine, a system for generating random text from recursive grammars. A free version is also hosted online. The essays are produced from a formal grammar defined by a recursive transition network.

== Responses ==
The Postmodernism Generator was mentioned by biologist Richard Dawkins in the conclusion to his article "Postmodernism Disrobed" (1998) for the scientific journal Nature, reprinted in his book A Devil's Chaplain (2004).

After he "produced the first two [lines] using a 'Postmodernism Generator,' and the second two using an 'Analytic Philosophy Generator'", philosophy of information and information ethics researcher Luciano Floridi stated, that

"So many resources are devoted to internal issues that no external input can be processed anymore, and the system stops working. The world may be undergoing a revolution, Rome may be burning, but the philosophical discourse remains detached, meaningless, and utterly oblivious. Time for an upgrade."

== See also ==
- Academese
- Parody generator
- Paper generator
- SCIgen
- Sokal affair
