= 50 Great Myths of Popular Psychology =

2009 popular science book

50 Great Myths of Popular Psychology: Shattering Widespread Misconceptions about Human Behavior
- Language: English
- Publisher: Wiley-Blackwell
- Publication date: 2009

50 Great Myths of Popular Psychology: Shattering Widespread Misconceptions about Human Behavior is a 2009 book written by psychologists Scott O. Lilienfeld, Steven Jay Lynn, John Ruscio, and Barry Beyerstein, and published by the Wiley-Blackwell publishing company.

The book is a guide to critical thinking about psychology. It has 11 chapters categorizing 50 subtopics of psychology. This book discusses a number of most widespread and believed myths of popular psychology — a type of psychology that is not based on scientifically proven facts, but are well known by the general public — and helps people learn how identify false claims. It has received positive reviews from both academic and popular reviewers.
