= Tomasz Witkowski =

Polish psychologist (born 1963)

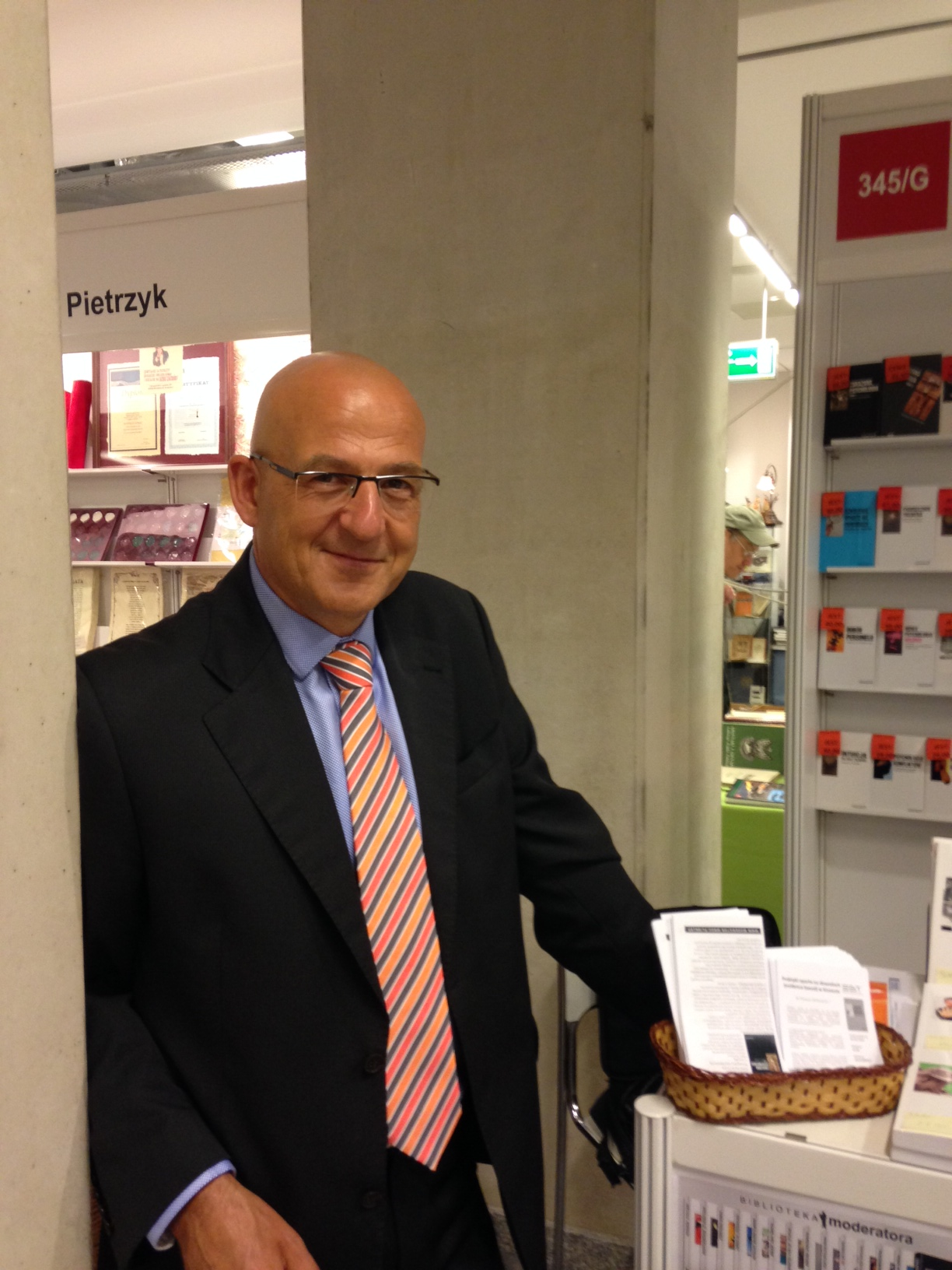
- Witkowski in May 2014
- Born: 1963 (age 62–63); Poland
- Education: University of Wrocław
- Known for: Scientific skepticism
- Scientific career
- Fields: Psychology; pseudoscience
- Tomasz Witkowski's voice Recorded September 2015
- Website: tomaszwitkowski.pl (Polish); Psychology Gone Wrong (English)

Tomasz Witkowski (Polish: [ˈtɔmaʐ vitˈkɔfskʲi]; born 1963) is a Polish psychologist, skeptic and science writer. He is a professor of psychology at the University College of Professional Education in Wrocław, Poland. He is known for his unconventional campaigns against pseudoscience. He specializes in debunking pseudoscience, particularly in the fields of psychology, psychotherapy, and diagnostics. Witkowski also engages in debates on pseudoscience-related topics, emphasizing scientific skepticism.

== Biography ==
Witkowski studied psychology at the University of Wrocław, graduating in 1988. After graduating, he worked for ten years as a senior lecturer at the same university. He received a Ph.D. in Psychology from the university in 1995.

In addition to his teaching duties at the University of Wrocław, Witkowski received a scholarship at Bielefeld University in 1993, and worked as a researcher at the University of Hildesheim in 1997. From 2004–2007, after leaving the University of Wroclaw, he lectured at the University of Social Sciences and Humanities. He is also the founder of the Klub Sceptyków Polskich (Polish Skeptics Club).

Witkowski has authored over a dozen of books, tens of scientific articles, and over 200 popular science articles. His scientific articles have been published in journals including the British Journal of Social Psychology, Polish Psychological Bulletin, Journal of Social Psychology, Skeptical Inquirer, Research Digest, and The Scientific Review of Mental Health Practice. He published three books in English: Psychology Led Astray: Cargo Cult in Science and Therapy (2016) and Psychology Gone Wrong: The Dark Sides of Science and Therapy (co-written with Maciej Zatonski, 2015), both published by BrownWalker Press, Shaping Psychology: Perspectives on Legacy, Controversy and the Future of the Field, Palgrave Macmillan, (2020), and Fads, Fakes, and Frauds: Exploding Myths in Culture, Science and Psychology, foreworded by Roy Baumeister, Universal Publishers, (2022).

Witkowski is frequently contacted by the media to comment on alleged frauds and abuses in psychology, psychotherapy, and other areas of scientific activity. Some of the topics he discusses include questionable treatments aimed at children, including educational kinesiology, attachment therapy, trauma debriefing, Facilitated Communication, Dolphin Therapy.

He also writes and publishes fiction: short stories and screenplays.

He is a recipient of the Rationalist of the Year award, granted by the Polskie Stowarzyszenie Racjonalistów (Polish Society of Rationalists). In 2019, he won a poll of the Focus magazine in the Scientific Activist of the Year category.

=== Sokal-style hoax ===
In 2007, Witkowski repeated the Sokal hoax. He managed to publish an article on morphic resonance in the psychology journal Charaktery. Most of the 'facts' in the article were completely false. The journal's editors checked the data and actively 'helped' to write the article, by proposing to add to it pirated excerpts from an old review of Rupert Sheldrake. The hoax received publicity from the James Randi Educational Foundation, as well as other science bloggers.

=== Psychology is Science not Witchcraft campaign ===
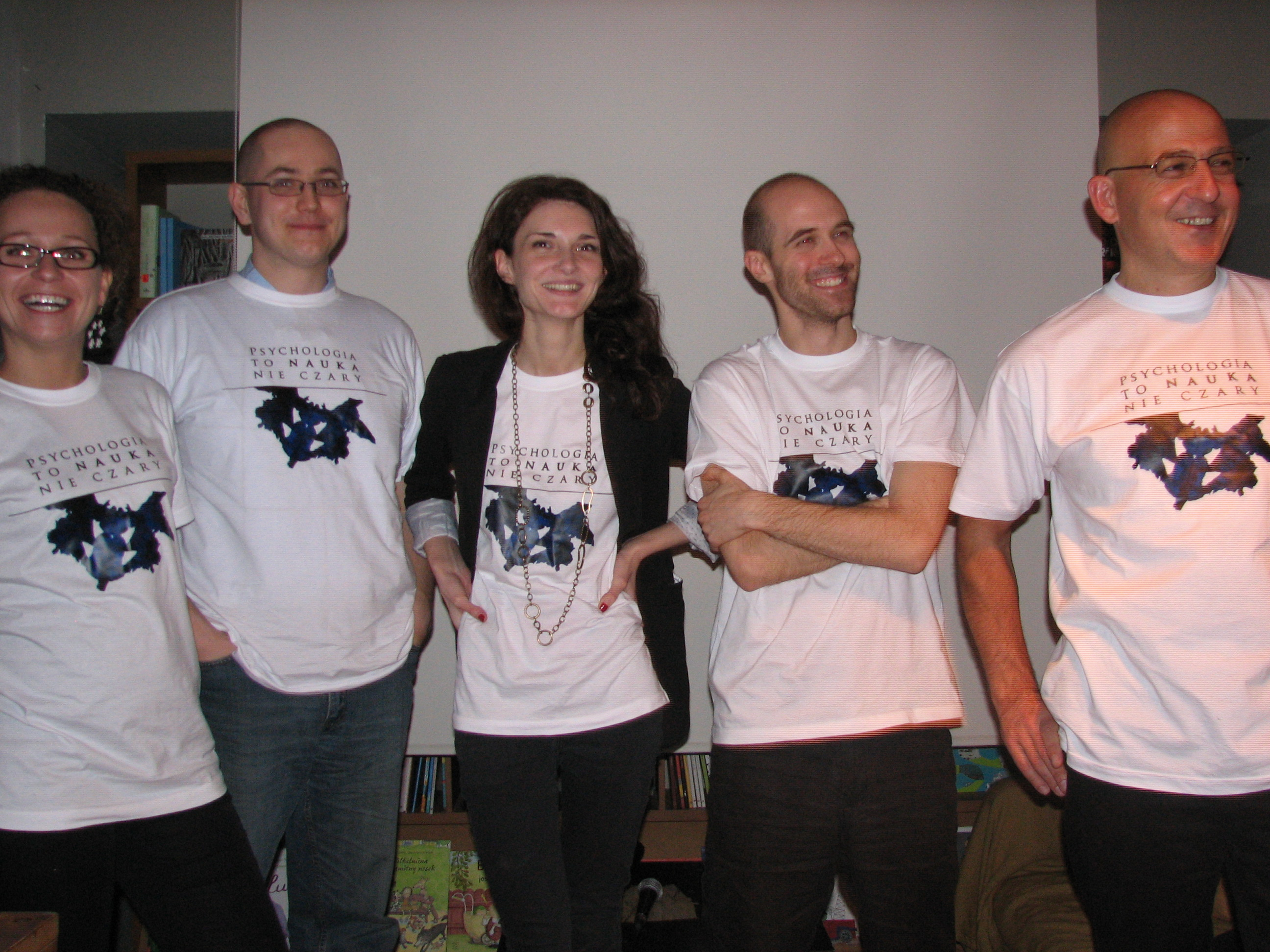
Witkowski (right) and fellow skeptics at a 2012 protest of abuses in psychology.

In March 2012, Witkowski and fellow Polish Skeptics Club members organized and coordinated a campaign in Poland called "Psychology is Science not Witchcraft." The campaign was aimed at publicizing the notion that many projective diagnostic tests have poor or no validity. It also sought to raise concerns among professional psychologists who still use such tests exclusively in clinical diagnosis or in legal proceedings. Information about the campaign was publicized by major nationwide journals, newspapers, and radio stations, as well as on the largest Polish Internet portals.

Over 140 people from nine large non-governmental organizations took part in a four-day protest. Scientists, lecturers, and students wore T-shirts featuring Rorschach inkblots and the campaign's slogan at their universities, in their workplaces, and on the streets. The campaign also organized a number of open lectures and other events. Finally, they published Rorschach inkblots in the Polish-language version of Wikipedia.

== Views ==
Witkowski describes himself as a "subtractive epistemologist". He is a staunch critic of the scientific validity of many psychotherapeutic modalities, concepts like neuro-linguistic programming, Adult Children of Alcoholics syndrome, and projective tests. He criticizes scientific psychology for the lack of reproducibility, low access to raw data and proliferative character of his discipline. He is also an advocate of applications of artificial intelligence (AI) in applied psychology and psychotherapy.

Physician and author Harriet Hall, who wrote reviews on Witkowski's books, points out that his myth busting on diverse topics such as psychology, science and culture, prompts readers to reconsider many of their cherished beliefs to eventually realise that much of what we think we know is wrong. "You may not agree with everything Witkowski says, but you would do well to follow his example and question everything you have been taught. Ideas that everyone assumes are true may not be. He writes well, tells good stories, and offers examples that will make you think. Readers will be challenged and may be provoked to change their minds about things they once took for granted", remarks Hall.

Suicide is a long stigmatized matter according to Witkowski. He notes that society packaged suicide in a particular type of hypocrisy, where it's either presented as an admirable act of heroism (when committed in the name of God, homeland, honor etc), or as a mortal sin (when carried out in order to end one's own misery). We euthanize animals when they are suffering but condemn humans who see suicide as a way to end suffering. He says, “we have treated death unambiguously as an evil, and consequently we impose the obligation to live on others”.

== Works ==
=== Significant journal articles ===
- Witkowski, T., & Stiensmeier-Pelster, J. (1998) Performance Deficits following Failure: Learned Helplessness or Self-esteem Protection? British Journal of Social Psychology. 37, 59-71.
- Tomasz Witkowski: Thirty-Five Years of Research on Neuro-Linguistic Programming. NLP Research Data Base. State of the Art or Pseudoscientific Decoration?, Polish Psychological Bulletin, 2010, vol 41 (2), s. 58-66.
- Witkowski, T., (2010) History of the Open Letter in Defence of Reason. Skeptical Inquirer, 34.
- Tomasz Witkowski: Psychological Sokal-style hoax, The Scientific Review of Mental Health Practices, 2011, vol. 8 (1), s. 50-60.
- Tomasz Witkowski: A Review of Research Findings on Neuro-Linguistic Programming, The Scientific Review of Mental Health Practice, 2012, vol. 9 (1), s. 29-40.
- Witkowski, T., & Zatonski, M. (2013). The ‘Psychology is Science, not Witchcraft’ Campaign. Skeptical Inquirer, 57(4), 50-53.
- Tomasz Witkowski, Maciej Zatoński: In Twenty-First-Century Europe Public Prosecutor Appoints Clairvoyant as Expert Witness, Skeptical Inquirer, September/October 2013, s. 7.
- Witkowski, T. (2013). Letter to Editor. Polish Psychological Bulletin, 44(4), 462-464.
- Tomasz Witkowski: A Scientist Pushes Psychology Journals toward Open Data, Skeptical Inquirer, July/August 2017.
- Tomasz Witkowski: The Primum non nocere principle in psychotherapy: A science-based approach, Science Based Medicine, July 26, 2018.
- Tomasz Witkowski: Is the Glass Half Empty or Half Full? Latest Results in the Replication Crisis in Psychology, Skeptical Inquirer, March/April 2019.
- Tomasz Witkowski, Maciej Zatoński: A miracle cancer prevention and treatment? Not necessarily as the analysis of 26 articles by legendary Hans Eysenck shows, Science Based Medicine, January 31, 2020.

=== Books ===
==== In English ====
- Psychology Gone Wrong: The Dark Sides of Science and Therapy Boca Raton, Florida: BrownWalker Press, (2015)
- Psychology Led Astray: Cargo Cult in Science and Therapy, Boca Raton, Florida: BrownWalker Press, (2016)
- Shaping Psychology: Perspectives on Legacy, Controversy and the Future of the Field, Palgrave Macmillan, (2020)
- Fads, Fakes, and Frauds: Exploding Myths in Culture, Science and Psychology, foreworded by Roy Baumeister, Boca Raton, Florida: Universal Publishers, (2022)
- Recipe for a 21st-Century Children's Crusade. Essays on Culture, Science, and Psychology, foreworded by Roy Baumeister, Boca Raton, Florida: Universal Publishers, (2025)

==== In Polish ====
- Psychologia konfliktów. Praktyka radzenia sobie ze sporami (1995)
- Nowoczesne metody doboru i oceny personelu ed., (1998)
- Psychomanipulacje. Jak je rozpoznawać i jak sobie z nimi radzić (2000)
- Psychologia kłamstwa. Motywy, strategie, narzędzia (2002)
- Podręcznik trenera (2004)
- Inteligencja makiaweliczna. Rzecz o pochodzeniu natury ludzkiej (2005)
- Dobór personelu. Koncepcje, narzędzia, konteksty ed., (2007)
- Psychologia dla trenerów (2008)
- Zakazana psychologia. Pomiędzy szarlatanerią a nauką. T. I (2009)
- Zakazana psychologia. Nauka kultu cargo i jej owoce. T. II (2013)
- Psychoterapia bez makijażu. Rozmowy o terapeutycznych niepowodzeniach. (2018)
- Zakazana psychologia. O cnotach, przywarach i uczynkach małych wielkich uczonych. T. III (2019)
- Giganci psychologii. Rozmowy na miarę XXI wieku. (2021)
- Przepędźcie guru, którzy radzą, jak żyć i inne eseje. (2024)
- Zawracanie statków głupców i inne eseje. (2025)

=== Significant public appearances ===
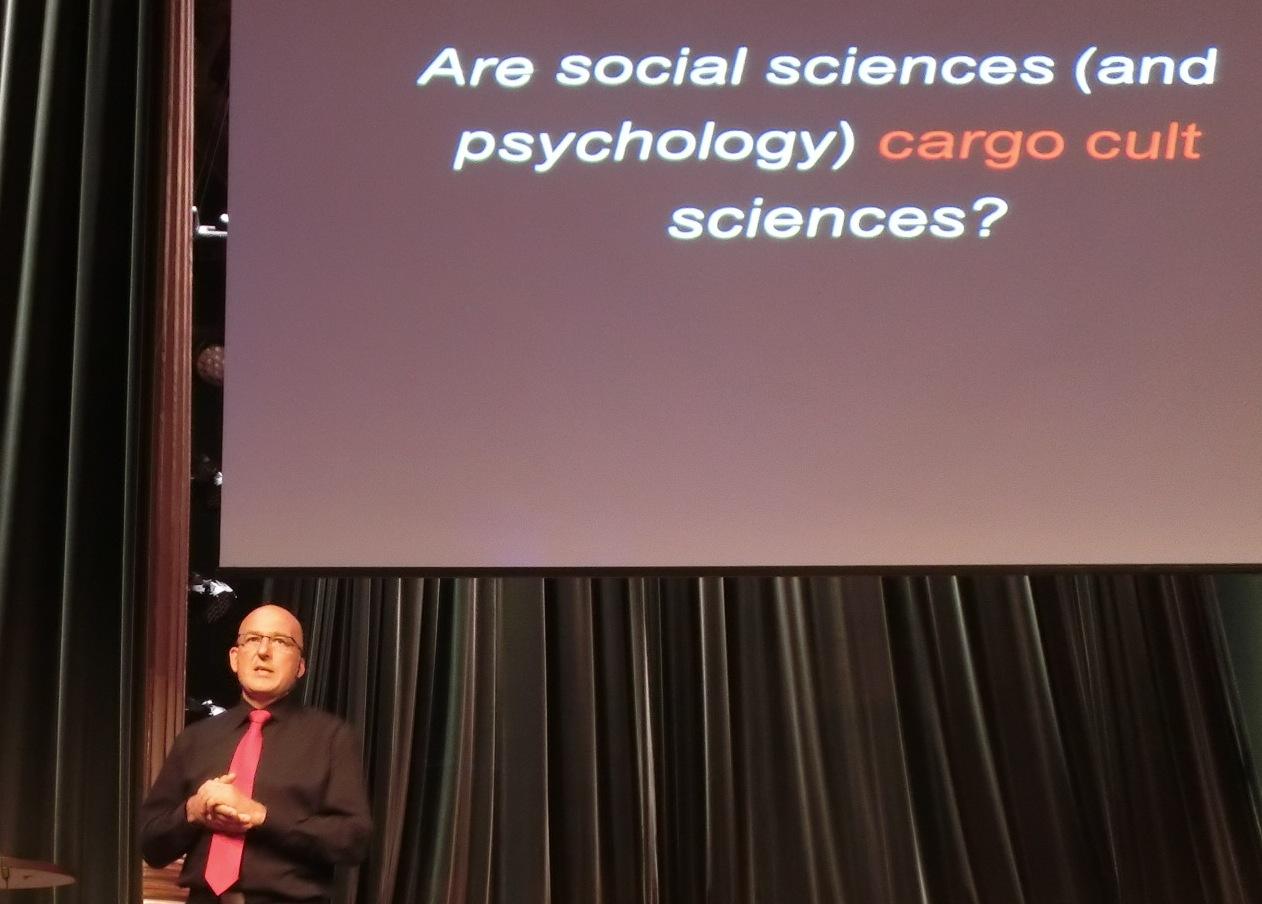
Tomasz Witkowski lecturing at the 15th European Skeptics Congress 2013.

- Witkowski, T. (September 2017). Skeptical Psychology panel discussion with Susan Blackmore, Scott Lilienfeld, Zbyněk Vybíral and Michael Heap. 17th European Skeptics Congress, Wrocław, Poland.
- Witkowski, T. (August, 2013). Is Psychology a Cargo Cult Science? 15th European Skeptics Congress in Stockholm, Sweden. video
- Witkowski, T., (May 2012) Pseudoscience in teaching of psychology. The most dangerous myths, frauds, and urban legends. VI World Sceptics Congress Promoting Science in Age of Uncertainty, Berlin.
- Witkowski, T., (September 2010) Fashionable nonsense still in fashion. Psychological Sokal-style hoax. XIV European Sceptics Congress, Budapest.
