= Ted Goertzel =

American sociologist and professor of sociology

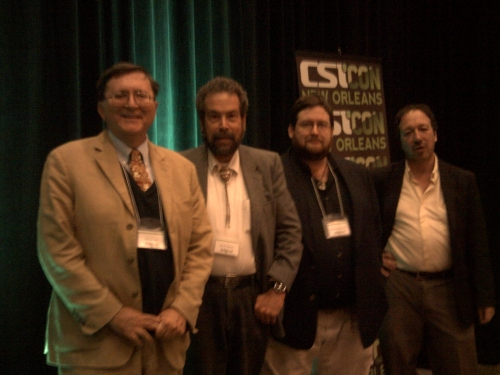
- Goertzel (left) with Dave Thomas, Bob Blaskiewicz and Scott Lilienfeld at the CSICon 2011 conspiracy theories panel
- Born: November 20, 1944 (age 81)
- Education: Antioch College (B.A., 1964), Washington University in St. Louis (M.A., 1966; Ph.D., 1970)
- Known for: Research on conspiracy theories
- Children: 2, including Ben Goertzel
- Scientific career
- Fields: Sociology
- Workplaces: Rutgers University–Camden
- Thesis: Brazilian student attitudes towards politics and education (1970)

Ted George Goertzel (born November 20, 1942) is an emeritus professor in the Sociology Department at Rutgers University–Camden. He is the author and co-author of books and articles spanning from social economy, politics, and conspiracy theories. He is the father of Ben Goertzel, with whom he co-authored the 1995 book Linus Pauling: A Life in Science and Politics.

== Conspiracy theories ==
As a social scientist, Goertzel studied conspiracy theories and conspiracy thinking in depth. One of his first studies on the subject started in 1992 with a telephone survey of 348 randomly chosen residents in southwestern New Jersey. The survey was of 10 conspiracy theories circulating at that time. He concluded that anomie, insecurity, and lack of trust in people are positively correlated to conspiratorial thinking. Moreover, people who believe in a conspiracy theory are more likely to believe in more than one.

He is therefore considered an expert on rumors, including the Zika conspiracy theories, ebola, and Moon landing conspiracies.

== Books ==
- Brazil’s Lula: Rise and Fall of an Icon. Amazon Kindle Books 2018.
- Presidential Leadership in the Americas Since Independence, by Guy Burton and Ted Goertzel. Lexington Publishers, October 2016
- The End of the Beginning: Life, Society and Economy on the Brink of the Singularity. Ben Goertzel and Ted Goertzel, editors. Kindle Books 2014
- The Drama of Brazilian Politics: From 1814-2015. Ted Goertzel and Paulo Roberto de Almeida, editors.
- Brazil's Lula: The Most Popular Politician on Earth. Brown Walker Publishers, 2011.
- Cradles of Eminence: Second Edition. Scottsdale, Arizona: Great Potential Press, 2003. By Victor and Mildred Goertzel, updated by Ted George Goertzel and Ariel M.W. Hansen.
- Fernando Henrique Cardoso: Reinventing Democracy in Brazil. Boulder: Lynne Rienner, 1999.
- Linus Pauling: A Life in Science and Politics. With Ben Goertzel, Mildred Goertzel and Victor Goertzel. New York: Basic Books, 1995.
- Turncoats and True Believers: The Dynamics of Political Belief and Disillusionment. Buffalo: Prometheus Press, 1992.
- Sociology: Class, Consciousness and Contradictions. With Albert Szymanski. New York: D. VanNostrand, 1979.
- Three Hundred Eminent Personalities: A Psychosocial Analysis of the Famous. With Ariel Felton, Mildred Goertzel and Victor Goertzel. San Francisco: Jossey-Bass, 1978.
- Political Society. Chicago: Rand McNally, 1976.
