= Der Schlangemann =

Der Schlangemann is a freely available seven-minute short film in pseudo-German made by Andreas Hansson and Björn Renberg in Umeå, Sweden, 1998–2000. The film is in the form of an advertisement for a toy called Schlangemann, a Ken doll with an interchangeable penis in three sizes: normal, large, and gigantic. Der Schlangemann received the audience award for best short film at the 13th Annual Horror and Fantasy Film Festival in San Sebastián, Spain, November 2002.
