= Mark G. Shrime =

Surgeon and author

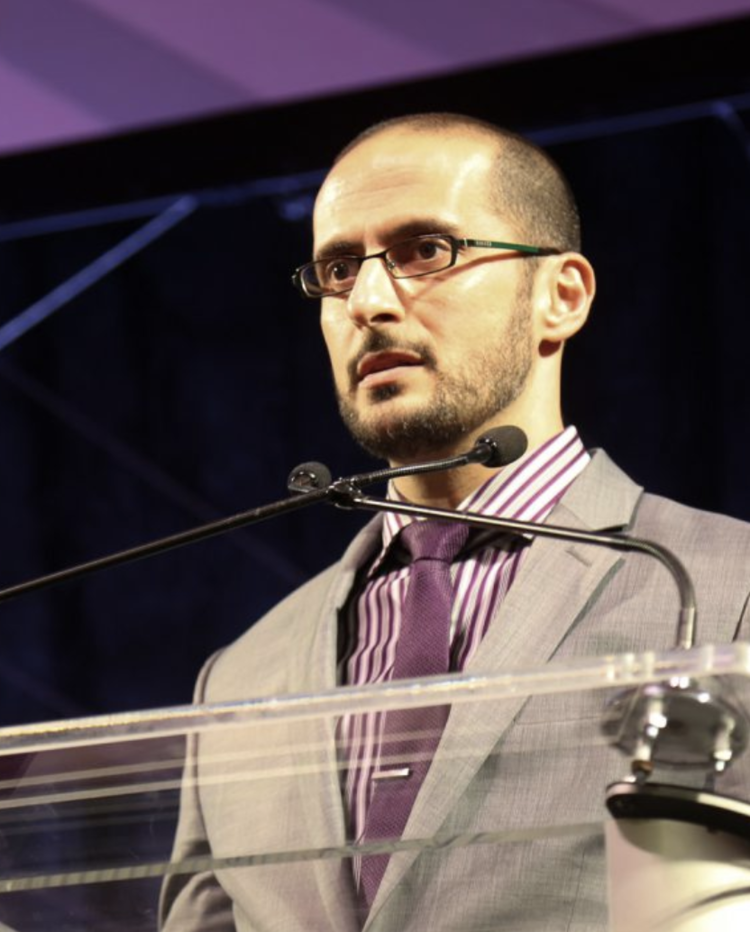
- Shrime in 2016
- Born: August 18, 1974 (age 52); Beirut, Lebanon
- Education: Princeton University; University of Texas Southwestern Medical School; Harvard T.H. Chan School of Public Health; Harvard University
- Occupations: Surgeon, professor of global surgery, author
- Writing career
- Genres: memoir, autobiography
- Notable work: Solving for Why

Mark G. Shrime is an American surgeon, researcher, public speaker, and the author of the book Solving for Why. He serves as editor-in-chief of BMJ Global Health.

Prior to that position, he served as the International Chief Medical Officer for Mercy Ships and was the inaugural chair of global surgery at the Royal College of Surgeons in Ireland. He is a Fellow of the American College of Surgeons.

== Education ==
Shrime studied molecular biology at Princeton University, earning an AB in 1996. He then earned his MD from the University of Texas Southwestern Medical School in 2001. He completed an internship in general surgery, followed by a residency in otolaryngology / head and neck surgery at the New York-Presbyterian Hospital. In 2006, he completed fellowship training in surgical oncology of the head and neck, and, in 2008, a fellowship in microvascular surgery, both at the University of Toronto. He is a board-certified otolaryngologist, licensed to practice in the Commonwealth of Massachusetts.

Shrime also received a masters in public health in 2011 from the Harvard School of Public Health (now Harvard T.H. Chan School of Public Health) and a PhD in health policy from Harvard University.

== Career ==
Shrime has worked as a surgeon with Mercy Ships since 2008. From 2009 to 2011, he worked as a head and neck surgical oncologist at the Boston Medical Center and the Boston VA Medical Center. In 2009, he was the first to publish the relationship between nodal density and survival in head and neck cancer. Beginning in 2011 and continuing until 2018, he worked as an otolaryngologist at the Massachusetts Eye and Ear Infirmary.

He also worked as the Research Director for the Harvard Program in Global Surgery and Social Change from 2011 until 2020. In 2018, Dr. Shrime became a visiting research scholar at the Princeton University Center for Health and Well-being. In July 2020, he took the role of Chair of Global Surgery at the Royal College of Surgeons in Ireland. He has published over 180 peer-reviewed publications, including in The Lancet and PLOS Medicine, and has an h-index of 64.

In 2019, Shrime delivered the commencement address at Cistercian Preparatory School, and in 2021, he delivered the Kapuscinski Lecture in Global Development, hosted by the European Commission. He was featured in the National Geographic documentary about Mercy Ships, The Surgery Ship.

In 2022, Shrime published his first book, Solving for Why with Twelve Books, an imprint of Hachette. In 2024, he delivered a TEDx talk entitled Putting Path over Purpose for a TEDx event at Boston College on the theme Solve for Why.

== Personal life ==
Shrime was born in 1974, in Beirut, Lebanon. His family emigrated to the United States in 1976, settling in Dallas, Texas. He competed on American Ninja Warrior, in seasons 8, 9, and 11.
