= Eddie Kohler =

American computer scientist

- Born: July 16, 1973 (age 53); Massachusetts
- Education: Massachusetts Institute of Technology
- Scientific career
- Fields: Computer science
- Workplaces: Harvard University, University of California, Los Angeles
- Doctoral advisor: Frans Kaashoek, Robert Morris

Eddie Kohler is an American computer scientist specializing in networks and operating systems. He is currently a professor of computer science at the Harvard John A. Paulson School of Engineering and Applied Sciences. Prior to Harvard, he was a professor at the University of California, Los Angeles.

Kohler co-founded Mazu Networks in 2000 and served as its Chief Scientist until it was acquired in 2009. In 2006, he was named as one of the Top 35 Innovators Under 35 by MIT Technology Review magazine. In 2014, he received the SIGOPS Mark Weiser Award, an award given annually to a researcher who has made "contributions that are highly creative, innovative, and possibly high-risk, in keeping with the visionary spirit of Mark Weiser." He is also the author of the HotCRP conference management software.

In 2005, Kohler (with David Mazières) wrote a paper titled "Get me off Your Fucking Mailing List" and sarcastically submitted it to a conference from which the two did not wish to receive further communications. Years later, the paper (submitted by another scientist to an ostensibly peer-reviewed technical journal) was accepted for publication, despite a nonsensical body text.

== Education ==
- Ph.D., Electrical Engineering and Computer Science, 2000. Massachusetts Institute of Technology.
- S.M., Electrical Engineering and Computer Science, 1997. Massachusetts Institute of Technology.
- S.B., Electrical Engineering and Computer Science, 1995. Massachusetts Institute of Technology.
- S.B., Music, 1995. Massachusetts Institute of Technology.
