= Charaktery =

Monthly magazine published in Poland

- Editor: Bogdan Białek
- Categories: Psychology
- Frequency: Monthly
- Circulation: 65 000
- Founded: 1997
- Company: Charaktery LLC
- Country: Poland
- Language: Polish
- Website: www.charaktery.com.pl
- ISSN: 1427-695X
- OCLC: 68738024

Charaktery (Polish: [xarakˈtɛrɨ], Personalities) is a monthly magazine published in Poland and covering psychology-related topics, such as relationships, mental health, the functioning of the brain, neuropsychology, emotions, overcoming addictions, depression, and alcoholism. It is written for an audience of non-psychologists. The magazine was established in 1997.

== Recognition ==
In September 2008 the Polish weekly newspaper Media i Marketing Polska chose the magazine as its "Magazine of the Year".

== Criticism ==
In 2007 Tomasz Witkowski submitted a hoax paper in the style of the Sokal affair.
