= International Journal of Advanced Computer Technology =

Predatory open access journal (2012-)

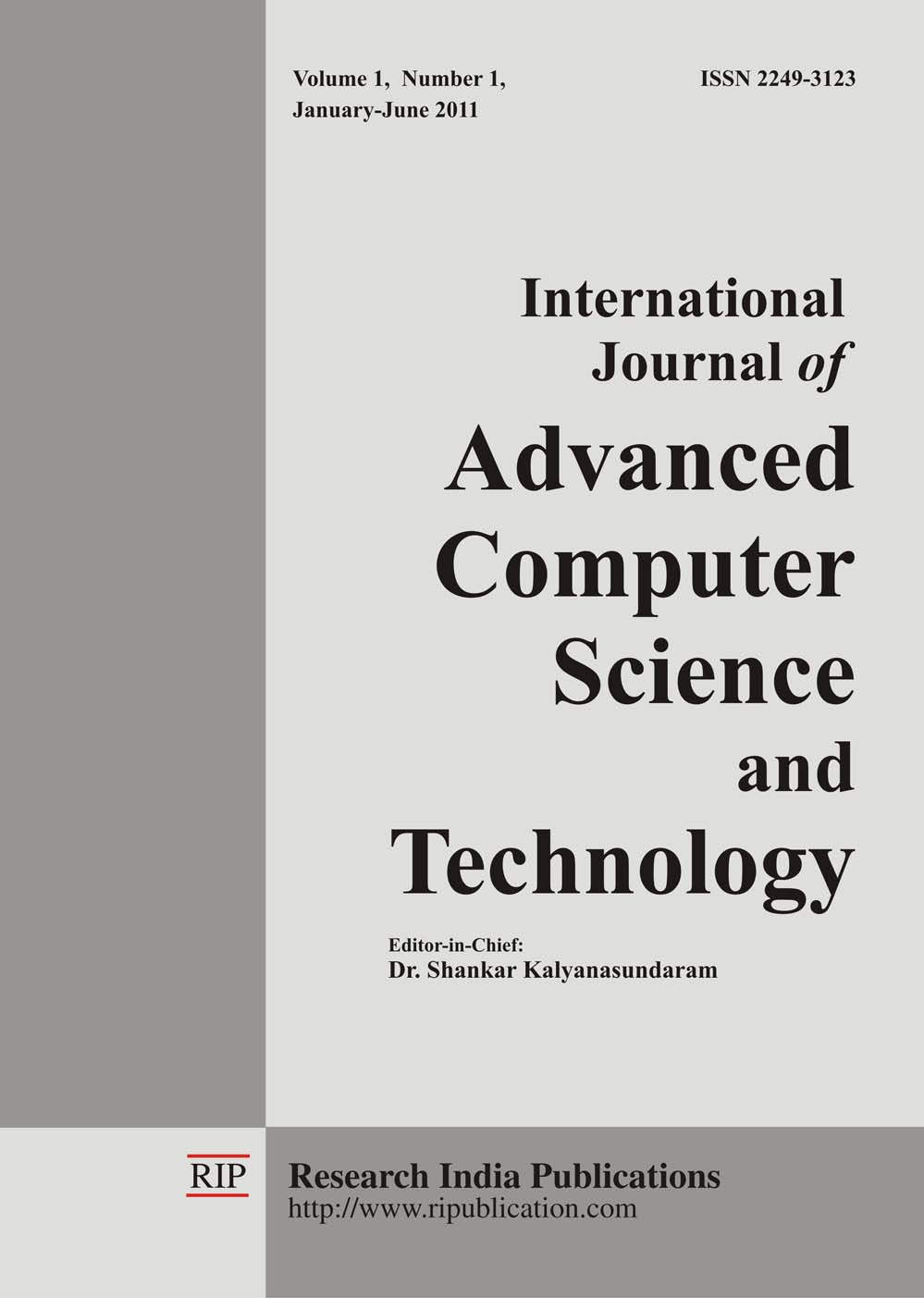
- Discipline: Computer science
- Language: English
- Edited by: Rishi Asthana

Publication details
- History: 2012–present
- Publisher: Research India Publications
- Frequency: Continuous
- Open access: Yes

Standard abbreviations
- ISO 4: Int. J. Adv. Comput. Technol.

Indexing
- ISSN: 2319-7900

Links
- Journal homepage; Online archive

The International Journal of Advanced Computer Technology (IJACT) is a publication which has been described as a predatory open access journal—a publication which has some of the surface attributes of a benign open access journal but is actually an exploitative and deceptive corruption of that model, operating as a disreputable vanity press with little scholarly value.

== Publication controversy ==
One of the figures from Mazières' and Kohler's paper

In 2005, two scientists, David Mazières and Eddie Kohler, wrote a paper titled Get me off Your Fucking Mailing List and submitted it to WMSCI 2005 (the 9th World Multiconference on Systemics, Cybernetics and Informatics), in protest of the conference's notoriety for its spamming and lax standards for paper acceptance. The paper consisted essentially only of the sentence "Get me off your fucking mailing list" repeated many times, sometimes as illustrations or diagrams.

In 2014, after receiving a spam email message from the International Journal of Advanced Computer Technology, Peter Vamplew, associate professor in information technology at Federation University Australia, forwarded Mazières' and Kohler's old paper as an acerbic response. To Vamplew's surprise, the paper was reviewed, and its appropriateness for the journal's publishing criteria was rated as "excellent" by the journal's peer-review process. It was accepted for publication with minor editorial changes. The paper was not actually published, as Vamplew declined to pay the required US$150 article processing charge. This case has led commenters to question the legitimacy of the journal as an authentic scholarly undertaking.
