= Scott Lilienfeld =

American psychologist (1960–2020)

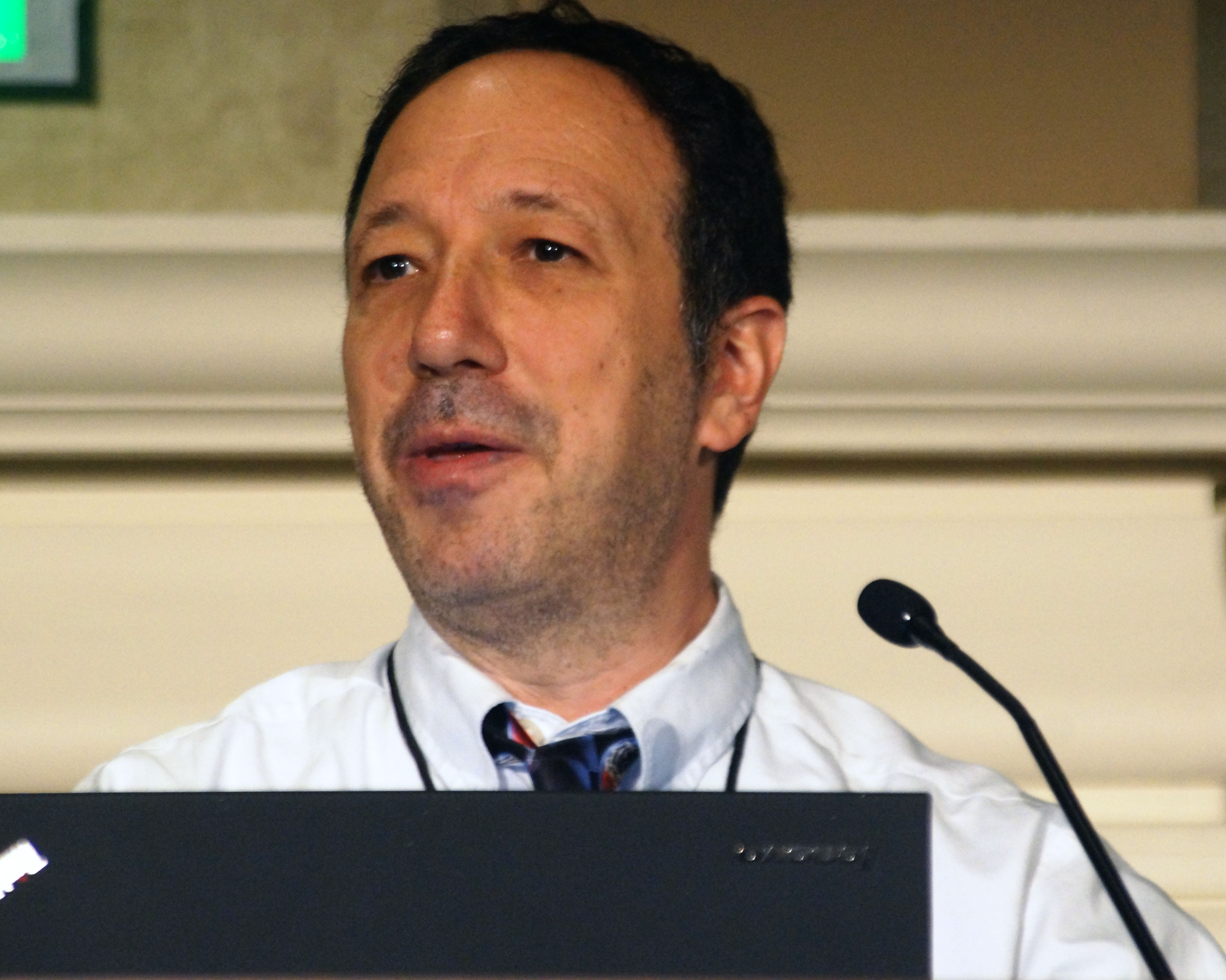
- Lilienfeld at CSICon 2012
- Born: Scott Owen Lilienfeld; December 23, 1960; New York City, U.S.
- Died: September 30, 2020 (aged 59); Atlanta, Georgia, U.S.
- Education: University of Minnesota
- Occupations: professor, psychologist
- Notable work: 50 Great Myths of Popular Psychology
- Scott Lilienfeld's voice Recorded September 2017

Scott Owen Lilienfeld (December 23, 1960 – September 30, 2020) was a professor of psychology at Emory University and advocate for evidence-based treatments and methods within the field. He is known for his books 50 Great Myths of Popular Psychology, Brainwashed, and others that explore and sometimes debunk psychological claims that appear in the popular press. Along with having his work featured in major U.S. newspapers and journals such as The New York Times, The New Yorker, and Scientific American, Lilienfeld made television appearances on 20/20, CNN and the CBS Evening News.

== Background ==
Lilienfeld was born on December 23, 1960, to Ralph and Thelma Lilienfeld of New York, N.Y.(in the Borough of Queens). Growing up, he was interested in paleontology and astronomy, but decided to study psychology after a high school course, then later a few college courses, piqued his interest. He has stated: "Although my love for natural science never waned, I eventually fell in love with the mysteries of the internal world — the human mind — even more than those of the external world."

Lilienfeld studied psychology at Cornell University in Ithaca, New York, where he graduated with a Bachelor of Arts degree in 1982. As an undergraduate, he was influenced by the work of David T. Lykken on psychopathic personality. Over time, he developed an interest in personality disorders, dissociative disorders, personality assessment, anxiety disorders, psychiatric classification, pseudoscience in psychology, and evidence-based practices in clinical psychology. Lilienfeld considered himself a generalist, saying "this breadth makes me a better researcher and thinker" with a broad perspective on the field of psychology.

In 1986, he began a clinical internship at Western Psychiatric Institute and Clinic in Pittsburgh, Pennsylvania, which he completed in 1987. He earned a doctorate in clinical psychology from the University of Minnesota in 1990.

From 1990 to 1994, Lilienfeld was an assistant professor of psychology at State University of New York in Albany, NY. From there, he moved to Emory University and served as associate professor until he earned full professorship in 2000.

In 2002, Lilienfeld founded the Scientific Review of Mental Health Practice. He was also a consulting editor for Skeptical Inquirer and Skeptic Magazine. He participated on the editorial boards of the Scientific Review of Alternative Medicine, Journal of Abnormal Psychology, Psychological Assessment, Perspectives on Psychological Science and Clinical Psychology Review, and wrote articles for Scientific American Mind and Psychology Today.

Lilienfeld was a professor of psychology at Emory University, Atlanta, GA. Lilienfeld died of pancreatic cancer at age 59, at his home in Atlanta, on September 30, 2020. He was remembered by his colleague Stuart Vyse as "the foremost authority on pseudoscience in psychology and a preeminent scholar of psychopathology."

== Career ==
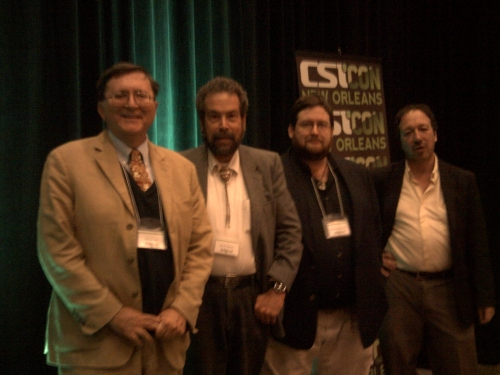
Conspiracy Panel at CSICon (left to right: Ted Goertzel, Dave Thomas, Bob Blaskiewicz, and Scott O. Lilienfeld)

Lilienfeld, along with his colleague Sally Satel, dedicated much of his career in psychology to debunking "the pop neuroscience that keeps making headlines". They targeted such practices as functional magnetic resonance imaging (or neuroimaging) to "detect" moral and spiritual centers of the brain, which they called "oversimplified neurononsense". Their book Brainwashed: The Seductive Appeal of Mindless Neuroscience was a finalist in the Los Angeles Times Book Prize in Science in 2013. He has stated:

I predict, or at least hope, that the field [of psychology] will move to a more mature and nuanced understanding of the proper role of neuroscience in psychology. This will necessitate understanding that neuroscience can offer valuable insights for certain psychological questions but that different levels of analysis are more fruitful than neuroscience for other questions.

Lilienfeld wrote critically about eye movement desensitization and reprocessing (EMDR), the use of the Rorschach test to make psychological diagnosis, recovered memory therapy, real-world application of the concept of microaggressions, and misconceptions in autism research, such as the MMR vaccine controversy, noting that "multiple controlled studies conducted on huge international scales have debunked any statistical association between the MMR vaccine and autism", and fad treatments such as facilitated communication.

Lilienfeld also wrote critically about mindfulness and its derivates mindfulness-based stress reduction (MBSR) and mindfulness-based cognitive therapy (MBCT), calling its evidence "decidedly mixed", although he ultimately conceded that evidence supports their usefulness in treating depression and anxiety disorders.

During a James Randi Educational Foundation panel at the 2014 Amaz!ng Meeting, Lilienfeld was asked if he thought rationality could be taught. He responded that rationality and critical thinking are not natural to the human species and to some degree it can be taught, but added that they are very domain specific and may not generalise to other areas; a person can be completely rational in one area and very irrational in others. He said "I see science in many ways as a set of safeguards against confirmation bias", and that, while the structure of general science and the scientific community work to reduce confirmation bias, individual scientists are generally as susceptible to confirmation bias as other people are. Therefore, he said, "It's up to the scientific community ... to hold their feet to the fire and make sure that their confirmation bias does not get in the way of their corroborating their own hypotheses."

Following Lilienfeld's death, in 2020, the Association for Science in Autism Treatment published a tribute issue of Science in Autism Treatment and invited colleagues to reflect on Lilienfeld's legacy. Psychotherapist Donald Meichenbaum remembered his scholarship and critical-mindedness and his wise insistence on healthy professional self-doubt and self-criticism. From the skeptical community, behavioral scientist Stuart Vyse pointed out that Lilienfeld, a fellow of the Committee for Skeptical Inquiry, "questioned and poked in all directions looking for the weaknesses of logic or evidence in any belief, while at the same time exhibiting unfailing respect for the people who might hold that belief." Shauna Bowes, a doctoral student at Emory University, emphasized the direct applicability of Lilienfeld's research to individuals' lives and remembered him as a passionate and dedicated teacher.

== 50 Great Myths of Popular Psychology ==
In his book, 50 Great Myths of Popular Psychology: Shattering Widespread Misconceptions about Human Behavior, written with Steven Jay Lynn, John Ruscio and Barry Beyerstein, Lilienfeld examines 50 common myths about psychology and provides readers with a "myth busting kit" to help learn critical thinking skills and understand sources of psychological myths, such as word of mouth, inferring causation from correlation, and misleading film and media portrayals. Lilienfeld argues that there is a large and growing difference between traditional psychology and "pop psychology", and that personal experiences, intuition and common sense fuel pop psychology and are compelling and powerful, but are also "limiting when testing theories... about the brain". He states that hundreds of self-help books are published every year because people want "quick, easy solutions" to their problems.

The book includes such topics as the percent of brain power people use, the use of products such as Baby Einstein in child development, subliminal messaging in advertising, the use of hypnosis for memory retrieval, and symbolism in dreams. The 50 myths selected for the book were chosen based on personal experiences by the authors, a publisher survey of dozens of psychology professors who identified commonplace myths among their students, and myths that are "deeply embedded in popular culture", like the polygraph test and the Men Are from Mars, Women Are from Venus myth. The book's appendix includes "recommended websites for exploring psychomythology."

Though Lilienfeld understands that books like the 50 Great Myths will do little to fix people's credulity when it comes to popular myths, he is hopeful that maybe these books will have a 1% effect on changing minds.

== Skepticism ==
Scott Lilienfeld speaks about confirmation bias at the European Skeptics Congress 2017.

Lilienfeld wrote and spoke about the need for better communication between skeptic groups, which can be insular, and the general public. He pointed out that, to debunk a myth, people need some other information to replace it, and that this is an idea skeptics have not always understood. He suggested that "skeptics should become more outspoken" when myths are presented as facts in the media. Instead of ignoring misinformation and thinking "I'm just one voice, what kind of impact can I have?", Lilienfeld supported the idea of empowering people to speak out in their area of expertise. "If everyone spoke out in their field of expertise and wrote to newspapers and television stations, we would eventually have an effect." Lilienfeld cautioned that the skeptical community needs to insist on evidence, but always keep an open mind that a claim could possibly be true.

Lilienfeld taught his students what he calls the "potential warning signs of pseudoscience". Most pseudosciences, Lilienfeld says:

tend to focus more on confirming than on refuting hypotheses, casually invoke ad hoc hypotheses (escape hatches) as a means of immunizing their claims from falsification, lack the self-correcting character of mature sciences, make exaggerated claims that greatly outstrip the evidence, try to evade peer review, insist that only insiders are qualified to evaluate their claims, claim to invent entirely new paradigms out of whole cloth, and so on.

== Awards and fellowships ==
- David Shakow Award for Outstanding Early Career Contributions to Clinical Psychology from the American Psychological Association Division 12 (1998)
- James McKeen Cattell Fellow Award (2013)
- Committee for Skeptical Inquiry Fellow,
- Institute for Science in Medicine Founding Fellow
- Association for Psychological Science Fellow
- Association for Psychological Science establishes the Scott O. Lilienfeld APS Travel Award
- The Scott O. Lilienfeld Prize for Scientific Thinking in Clinical Psychology was established in partnership with Cambridge University Press by Dr. Lilienfeld's colleagues Drs. Douglas Berstein, Bunmi Olatunji, and Bethany Teachman. Each year this prize is awarded to one undergraduate from any university course using their textbook, Introduction to Clinical Psychology: Bridging Science and Practice (2020).

== Lectures and appearances ==
- Skeptical Psychology panel discussion with Susan Blackmore, Zbyněk Vybíral, Tomasz Witkowski and Michael Heap at the 17th European Skeptics Congress (September 2017).
- Can Rationality Be Taught? panel discussion with Daniel Dennett, Julia Galef, Barbara Drescher, Ginger Campbell at The Amaz!ng Meeting (July 2014)
- The Psychology of Pseudoscience in Medicine panel discussion with Steven Novella, Harriet Hall and Paul Offit at The Amaz!ng Meeting (July 2014)
- Does Psychology Get a Bad Rap? Why Many People View the Study of Human Nature as Unscientific, Quinnipiac University School of Law (March 2014)
- Speaker at CSICon 2011 (October 2011)
- Science, Nonscience, and Nonsense in Psychotherapeutic Practice, Misericordia University (March 2009)

== Books ==
- Happiness, and Well-Being: Better Living through Psychological Science with Steven J. Lynn and William T. O'Donohue (Sage, 2015) ISBN 978-1-452-20317-1
- The Encyclopedia of Clinical Psychology (editor) with Robin L. Cautin (John Wiley and Sons, 2015) ISBN 978-1-118-62539-2
- Brainwashed: The Seductive Appeal of Mindless Neuroscience by Sally Satel, with Scott O. Lilienfeld (Basic Books, 2015) ISBN 978-0-465-06291-1
- Facts and Fictions in Mental Health with Hal Arkowitz (Wiley Blackwell, 2015) ISBN 978-1-118-31130-1
- Psychology: Introducing Psychology: Brain, Person, Group with Robin S. Rosenberg, Stephen M. Kosslyn, Steven J. Lynn, Laura L. Namy, Nancy J. Woolf (Pearson Custom Library, 2014) ISBN 978-1-269-29921-3
- Science and Pseudoscience in Clinical Psychology with Steven Jay Lynn, Jeffrey M. Lohr, Carol Tavris (foreword) (The Guildford Press, 2014) ISBN 978-1-462-51789-3
- Psychology: From Inquiry to Understanding, Science and Pseudoscience in Clinical Psychology with Steven J. Lynn (Pearson Custom Library, 2010) ISBN 978-0-205-96118-4
- 50 Great Myths of Popular Psychology: Shattering Widespread Misconceptions about Human Behavior with Steven Jay Lynn, John Ruscio, Barry Beyerstein (Wiley-Blackwell, 2009) ISBN 978-1-405-13112-4
- Psychological Science in the Courtroom: Consensus and Controversy (editor) with Jennifer L. Skeem and Kevin S. Douglas (Guilford, 2009) ISBN 978-1-606-23251-4
- Psychology: A Framework for Everyday Thinking with Steven J. Lynn, Laura L. Namy, Nancy J. Woolf (Pearson, 2009) ISBN 978-0-205-65048-4
- Study Guide for Psychology: A Framework for Everyday Thinking with Steven J. Lynn, Laura L. Namy, Nancy J. Woolf (Pearson, 2009) ISBN 978-0-205-75717-6
- Navigating the Mindfield: A Guide to Separating Science from Pseudoscience in Mental Health with John Ruscio, Steven J. Lynn (Prometheus Books, 2008) ISBN 978-1-591-02467-5
- The Great Ideas of Clinical Science: 17 Principles that Every Mental Health Professional Should Understand with William T. O'Donohue (Routledge, 2006) ISBN 978-0-415-95038-1
- What's Wrong with the Rorschach? Science Confronts the Controversial Inkblot Test with James M. Wood, M. Teresa Nezworski and Howard N. Garb (Jossey-Bass, 2003) 978-0-787-96056-8
- Science and Pseudoscience in Clinical Psychology (editor) with Steven Jay Lynn and Jeffrey M. Lohr (Guildford, 2002) ISBN 978-1-593-85070-8
- Looking into Abnormal Psychology: Contemporary Readings (Wadsworth Publishing, 1998) ISBN 978-0-534-35416-9
- Seeing Both Sides: Classic Controversies in Abnormal Psychology (Psychology Series) (Wadsworth Publishing, 1994) ISBN 978-0-534-25134-5

== Selected articles ==
- "The Ethical Duty to Know: Facilitated Communication for Autism as a Tragic Case Example" (March 2016)
- "Would the world be better off without religion? A skeptic’s guide to the debate" with Rachel Ammirati (July/August 2014)
- "The 'immature teen brain' defense and the Dzhokhar Tsarnaev trial" with Sally Satel (May 2015)
- "The adolescent brain defense: The Tsarnaev death sentence and beyond" with Sally Satel (May 2015)
- "Science debunks fad autism theories, but that doesn't dissuade believers" (March 2015)
- "EMDR: Taking a closer look" with Hal Arkowitz (December 2007)
- "Is there really an autism epidemic?" with Hal Arkowitz (December 2007)
- "Why scientists shouldn't be surprised by the popularity of intelligent design" (May/June 2006)
- "The scientific status of projective techniques" with James M. Wood and Howard N. Garb (November 2000).
