= World Multiconference on Systemics, Cybernetics and Informatics =

Annual computer science conference

WMSCI, the World Multi-conference on Systemics, Cybernetics and Informatics, is a conference that has occurred annually since 1995, which emphasizes the systemic relationships that exist or might exist among different disciplines in the fields of Systemics, Cybernetics, and Informatics. Organizers stress interdisciplinary communication, describing the conference as both wide in scope as a general international scientific meeting, and specifically focused in the manner of a subject-area conference.

== History ==
WMSCI is organized by the International Institute of Informatics and Systemics: IIIS (www.iiis.org). Its General Chair has usually been retired Professor Nagib Callaos. The conference is often held in Orlando, Florida.

The annual WMSCI Conference started in Baden-Baden, Germany in 1995 as ISAS (Information Systems Analysis and Synthesis). About 50 papers were presented. In 1997, after earning the non-financial sponsorship of the World Organization of Systems and Cybernetics (WOSC), the conference name was changed to World Conference on Systemics, Cybernetics, and Informatics: SCI. In 2005, the acronym was changed to WMSCI because SCI coincided with the acronym of the Scientific Citation Index, and colocated conferences had been added since then. The multi-conference has grown to have about 900 registered participants, as of 2004; the majority of attendees present papers. Since its inception in 1995, more than 10,000 papers have been presented in WMSCI and its collocated conferences.

Until 2005, WMSCI allowed about 15% of non-reviewed submissions, based on the importance of the topic or the potential presenter's curriculum vitae. In a workshop founded by the National Science Foundation, the general chair of the conference explained that they accepted non-reviewed papers because the conference is multi-disciplinary and scholarly associations of several conferences accept almost all submissions on a non-reviewed basis. The most prestigious and largest conferences of OR/MS (IFORS and INFORMS), for example, explicitly state on their web sites that "Contributed abstracts are not reviewed and virtually all abstracts are accepted." Consequently, WMSCI 2005 general chair, Dr. Nagib Callaos, stated that since the conference is multi-disciplinary, he saw no problem with accepting for presentation (not necessarily publication) 15% of non-reviewed submissions, in order to follow the standards of other disciplines like those represented by the International Federation of Operations Research Societies (IFORS), Institute for Operations Research and the Management Sciences (INFORMS, the International Federation of Operations Research Societies (IFORS), the American Mathematical Society, etc.

Since 2006, only reviewed papers are accepted, authors of accepted papers have access to the reviews of the reviewers who recommended the acceptance of their paper, and the reviewing process is based on double-blind and non-blind reviewing.

== Mission ==
WMSCI is a multi-disciplinary conference where participants focusing on one discipline may attend conferences from related areas. According to the organizers, "this systemic approach stimulates cross-fertilization among different disciplines, inspiring scholars, originating new hypothesis, supporting production of innovations and generating analogies, which is ... a fundamental aim in cybernetics". Objectives of the conference include identification of synergetic relationships among Systemics, Cybernetics and Informatics, and establishing communication channels among academic, professional, and business worlds. Their mission statement is as "a forum for focusing into specific disciplinary research, as well as for multi, inter and trans-disciplinary studies and projects". Some say that its mission is rather opaque. This opaqueness might be perceived from a strictly disciplinary, or sub-disciplinary perspective. WMSCI is intended to be a forum for both inter-disciplinary scholars, researchers, and professionals, as well as disciplinary researchers who are interested in presenting their disciplinary research and share information and knowledge with researchers from other disciplinary researchers aiming for potential cross-fertilization and analogical thinking, which provide input to logical thinking and empirical hypothesis formulation.

== SCIgen paper acceptance and exposure of citing non-refereed papers ==
In 2005, Jeremy Stribling, Daniel Aguayo, and Maxwell Krohn, three computer-science graduate students at MIT, submitted to WMSCI the paper Rooter: A Methodology for the Typical Unification of Access Points and Redundancy, generated by SCIgen, software they had developed to create nonsense papers in Computer Science. Stribling stated that the paper was submitted to WMSCI because of its repeated e-mails. In his words: "You see lists of speakers, and there's no one you've ever heard of... They spam us." Papers generated by this software were submitted to other similar conferences. The promotional policy of WMSCI followed strictly the USA Congress CAN-SPAM Act of 2003-2008. Following criticism of the per-conference-participant fees and their acceptance of talks without any review the organization responded as follows:

[We] think it is legitimate and academically respectful to accept non-reviewed papers, especially if we take into account that in the call for papers in our conferences has always been clearly stated that we accept NON-RESEARCH papers submission, as it is the case of position papers, invited papers, case studies, panels' presentations, reports, etc. which are usually accepted, or not, on a non-reviewing base.

Since 2006, the organization abandoned the policy of accepting for presentation (not necessarily publication) 15% of non-refereed papers. Papers of non-refereed presentations were eligible for publication in the post-conference edition of the proceedings if they are selected as the best paper by the respective session audience. Motivating their previous acceptance policy, based on 15% of non-refereed presentation which respective papers might be published if they are selected as the best of the respective sessions, the organization says:

In a survey made by the National Cancer Institute where "active, resilient, generally successful scientist researchers" were interviewed, just 17.7 percent of them disagreed with the statement "reviewers are reluctant to support unorthodox or high-risk research"... This is one of the reasons why, in WMSCI Conferences, we accepted in the past non-reviewed papers taking the intrinsic risks of this kind of paper acceptances. Deception was a risk that was not perceived at the moment of examining the risks of this kind of acceptance policy.

=== Post-2005 changes of refereeing policies ===
The average acceptance rate in 2009 at WMSCI and related conferences was 32.12%, with the average of 4.93 reviewers per paper/abstract. A combination of double blind peer reviews and non-anonymous peer reviews was used, with a total of 11902 reviews for the 2413 submissions. The organizers claim that for the refereed papers, the acceptance policy of WMSCI is the majority rule in both kind of reviewing, i.e. A majority of double blind reviewers and a majority of non-anonymous reviewers should recommend the acceptance of a submissions in order to be accepted for presentation and publication in the respective proceedings. More details regarding this two-tier reviewing methodology can be found at http://www.iiis.org/peer-reviewing.asp. when there is a tie between any kind of reviewers (double blind or non-anonymous)the tendency is to accept the respective submission. When there are a double tie among both kind of reviewers the tendency is to not accept the respective submission. This policy is (according to some people who contributed to this article) more liberal than that of other conferences using the alternative strategy, where papers are accepted when there is the positive agreement of the reviewers (This affirmation need to be referenced) According to the organizers, WMSCI's policy would probably increase the chances of accepting poor papers, but certainly decreases the chances of rejecting good papers. Motivating their acceptance policy, the organizers cite Ernst et al. who showed that the same paper was rated from "unacceptable" to "excellent" according to 6 out of 9 measures by 45 field experts. According to the organizers, their acceptance policy may be better suited for the purpose of bringing together multi-disciplinary engineering communities, and may reduce possibilities of plagiarism and fraud generated by the reviewing process (see also peer review, peer review failure).

== See also ==
- Oxford Round Table
