= Universal Publishers (United States) =

- Founded: 1999
- Founder: Jeffrey R. Young
- Country of origin: United States
- Headquarters location: Irvine, California
- Key people: Jeff Young, Publisher; Shereen Siddiqui, Artistic Director
- Publication types: Books, edited volumes, textbooks, monographs, conference proceedings, academic journals
- Nonfiction topics: technology, how-to, higher education, science, professional development
- Imprints: Universal-Publishers, Dissertation.com, BrownWalker Press
- Official website: www.universal-publishers.com

Universal Publishers is the parent publishing company of three non-fiction book imprints specializing in self-published nonfiction, how-to, technical and academic titles (Universal-Publishers, BrownWalker Press & Dissertation.com). It originally began in 1997 as "Dissertation.com," one of the first companies to use print on-demand and PDF (Portable Document Format) e-book technologies to publish academic theses and Ph.D. dissertations for sale online. The company was founded by Jeffrey R. Young, while he was in graduate school as a way to make academic dissertations widely available to other students and researchers at a reasonable price.

The BrownWalker Press imprint was launched in 2001 to publish academic textbooks, scholarly monographs, and edited collections across a wide range of academic expertise. In 2010, BrownWalker Press added an academic conference proceeding publishing division (ConferencePaper Publisher).

Universal Publishers has over 1500 nonfiction, how-to, and academic titles currently available in print and ebook editions, and releases about 50 new titles each year. In addition to worldwide distribution through Ingram Content Group, it has an independent distribution relationship for some of its titles in India with Overseas Press. The acquisition and administrative operations were relocated to Irvine, California in 2018 but still maintains a corporate presence in Boca Raton, Florida.
