= Science communication =

Public communication of science-related topics to non-experts

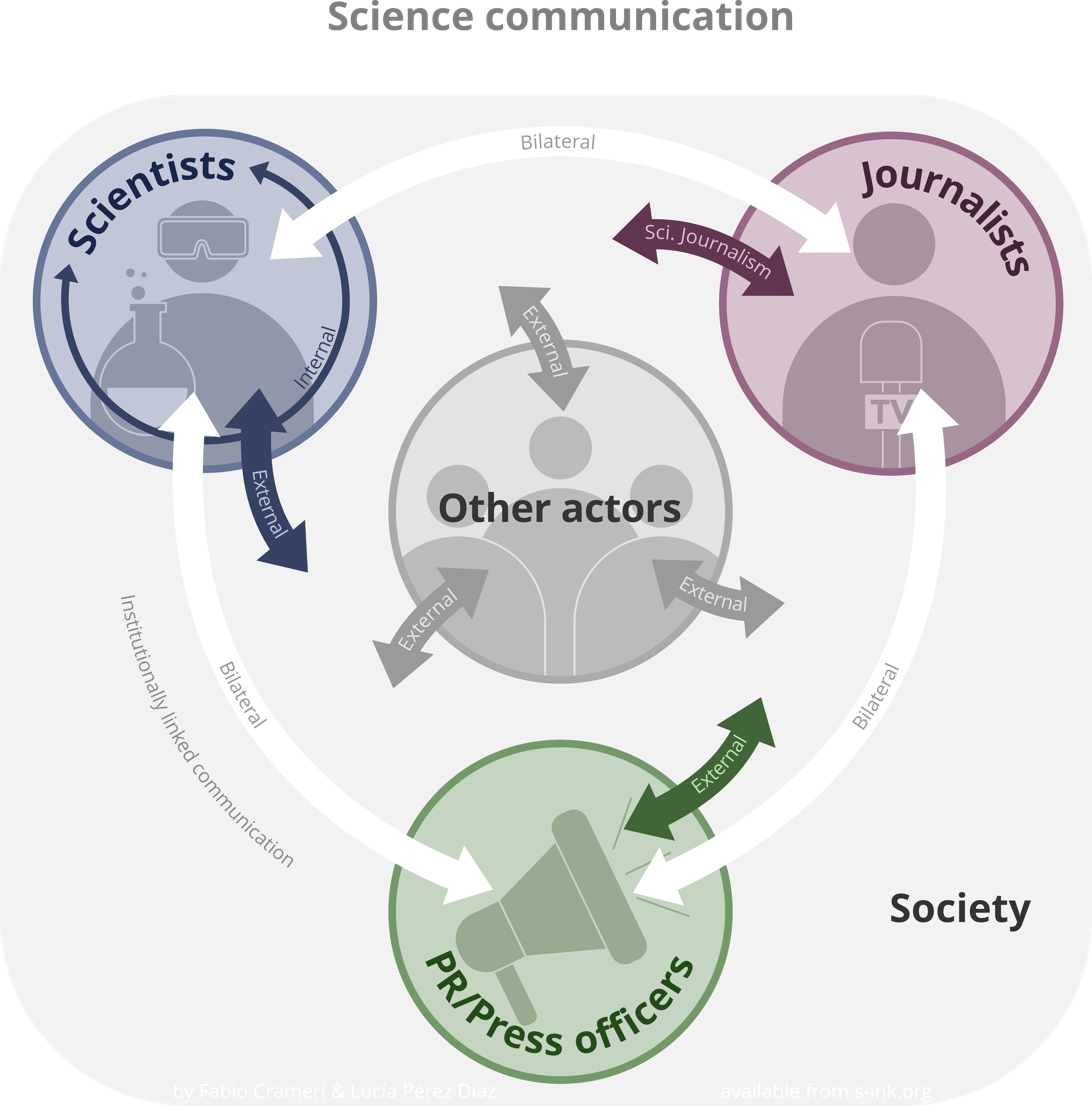
Schematic overview of the field and the actors of science communication according to Carsten Könneker

Science communication encompasses a wide range of activities that connect science and society. Common goals of science communication include informing non-experts about scientific findings, raising the public awareness of and interest in science, influencing people's attitudes and behaviors, informing public policy, and engaging with diverse communities to address societal problems. The term "science communication" generally refers to settings in which audiences are not experts on the scientific topic being discussed (outreach), though some authors categorize expert-to-expert communication ("inreach" such as publication in scientific journals) as a type of science communication. Examples of outreach include science journalism and health communication. Since science has political, moral, and legal implications, science communication can help bridge gaps between different stakeholders in public policy, industry, and civil society with trust-building playing a central role in this process.

Science communicators are a broad group of people: scientific experts, science journalists, science artists, medical professionals, nature center educators, science advisors for policymakers, and everyone else who communicates with the public about science. They often use entertainment and persuasion techniques including humour, storytelling, and metaphors to connect with their audience's values and interests.

Science communication also exists as an interdisciplinary field of social science research on topics such as misinformation, public opinion of emerging technologies, and the politicization and polarization of science. For decades, science communication research has had only limited influence on science communication practice, and vice-versa, but both communities are increasingly attempting to bridge research and practice.

Historically, academic scientists were discouraged from spending time on public outreach, but that has begun to change. Research funders have raised their expectations for researchers to have broader impacts beyond publication in academic journals. An increasing number of scientists, especially younger scholars, are expressing interest in engaging the public through social media and in-person events, though they still perceive significant institutional barriers to doing so.

Science communication is closely related to the fields of informal science education, citizen science, and public engagement with science, and there is no general agreement on whether or how to distinguish them. Like other aspects of society, science communication is influenced by systemic inequalities that impact both inreach and outreach.

== Motivations ==
Writing in 1987, Geoffery Thomas and John Durant advocated various reasons to increase public understanding of science, or scientific literacy. More trained engineers and scientists could allow a nation to be more competitive economically. Science can also benefit individuals. Science can simply have aesthetic appeal (e.g., popular science or science fiction). Living in an increasingly technological society, background scientific knowledge can help to negotiate it. The science of happiness is an example of a field whose research can have direct and obvious implications for individuals. Governments and societies might also benefit from more scientific literacy, since an informed electorate promotes a more democratic society. Moreover, science can inform moral decision making (e.g., answering questions about whether animals can feel pain, how human activity influences climate, or even a science of morality).

In 1990, Steven Hilgartner, a scholar in science and technology studies, criticized some academic research in public understanding of science. Hilgartner argued that what he called "the dominant view" of science popularization tends to imply a tight boundary around those who can articulate true, reliable knowledge. By defining a "deficient public" as recipients of knowledge, the scientists get to emphasize their own identity as experts, according to Hilgartner. Understood in this way, science communication may explicitly exist to connect scientists with the rest of society, but science communication may reinforce the boundary between the public and the experts (according to work by Brian Wynne in 1992 and Massimiano Bucchi in 1998). In 2016, the scholarly journal Public Understanding of Science ran an essay competition on the "deficit model" or "deficit concept" of science communication and published a series of articles answering the question "In science communication, why does the idea of a public deficit always return?" in different ways; for example, Carina Cortassa's essay argued that the deficit model of science communication is just a special case of an omnipresent problem studied in social epistemology of testimony, the problem of "epistemic asymmetry", which arises whenever some people know more about some things than other people. Science communication is just one kind of attempt to reduce epistemic asymmetry between people who may know more and people who may know less about a certain subject.

Biologist Randy Olson said in 2009 that anti-science groups can often be so motivated, and so well funded, that the impartiality of science organizations in politics can lead to crises of public understanding of science. He cited examples of denialism (for instance, climate change denial) to support this worry. Journalist Robert Krulwich likewise argued in 2008 that the stories scientists tell compete with the efforts of people such as Turkish creationist Adnan Oktar. Krulwich explained that attractive, easy to read, and cheap creationist textbooks were sold by the thousands to schools in Turkey (despite their strong secular tradition) due to the efforts of Oktar. Astrobiologist David Morrison has spoken of repeated disruption of his work by popular anti-scientific phenomena, having been called upon to assuage public fears of an impending cataclysm involving an unseen planetary object—first in 2008, and again in 2012 and 2017.

== Methods ==
Walter Lewin demonstrates conservation of potential energy. It can be difficult to captivatingly share good scientific thinking as well as scientifically accurate information. Krulwich and Olson believe scientists must rise to that challenge using metaphor and story telling.

The strongest correlates of self-reported changes in opinion about global warming were Republican party identification, seeing others experience impacts of global warming, learning more about global warming, and injunctive social norms (perceiving that others think it is important to act).

Science popularization figures such as Carl Sagan and Neil deGrasse Tyson are partly responsible for the view of science or a specific science discipline within the general public. However, the degree of knowledge and experience a science popularizer has can vary greatly. Because of this, some science communication can depend on sensationalism. Another point in the controversy of popular science is the idea of how public debate can affect public opinion. A relevant and highly public example of this is climate change. A science communication study appearing in The New York Times proves that "even a fractious minority wields enough power to skew a reader's perception of a [science news] story" and that even "firmly worded (but not uncivil) disagreements between commenters affected readers' perception of science." This causes some to worry about the popularizing of science in the public, questioning whether the further popularization of science will cause pressure towards generalization or sensationalism.

Marine biologist and film-maker Randy Olson published Don't Be Such a Scientist: Talking Substance in an Age of Style. In the book he describes how there has been an unproductive negligence when it comes to teaching scientists to communicate. Don't be Such a Scientist is written to his fellow scientists, and he says they need to "lighten up". He adds that scientists are ultimately the most responsible for promoting and explaining science to the public and media. This, Olson says, should be done according to a good grasp of social science; scientists must use persuasive and effective means like story telling. Olson acknowledges that the stories told by scientists need not only be compelling but also accurate to modern science—and says this added challenge must simply be confronted. He points to figures like Carl Sagan as effective popularizers, partly because such figures actively cultivate a likeable image.

Presenting data and other facts is less effective in motivating people to act to mitigate climate change, than financial incentives and social pressure involved in showing people climate-related actions of other people.

At his commencement address to Caltech students, journalist Robert Krulwich delivered a speech entitled "Tell me a story". Krulwich says that scientists are actually given many opportunities to explain something interesting about science or their work, and that they must seize such opportunities. He says scientists must resist shunning the public, as Sir Isaac Newton did in his writing, and instead embrace metaphors the way Galileo did; Krulwich suggests that metaphors only become more important as the science gets more difficult to understand. He adds that telling stories of science in practice, of scientists' success stories and struggles, helps convey that scientists are real people. Finally, Krulwich advocates for the importance of scientific values in general, and helping the public to understand that scientific views are not mere opinions, but hard-won knowledge.

Actor Alan Alda helped scientists and PhD students get more comfortable with communication with the help of drama coaches (they use the acting techniques of Viola Spolin).

Matthew Nisbet described the use of opinion leaders as intermediaries between scientists and the public as a way to reach the public via trained individuals who are more closely engaged with their communities, such as "teachers, business leaders, attorneys, policymakers, neighborhood leaders, students, and media professionals". Examples of initiatives that have taken this approach include Science & Engineering Ambassadors, sponsored by the National Academy of Sciences, and Science Booster Clubs, coordinated by the National Center for Science Education.

=== Evidence based practices ===
Similar to how evidence-based medicine gained a foothold in medical communication decades ago, researchers Eric Jensen and Alexander Gerber have argued that science communication would benefit from evidence-based prescriptions since the field faces related challenges. In particular, they argued that the lack of collaboration between researchers and practitioners is a problem: "Ironically, the challenges begin with communication about science communication evidence."

The overall effectiveness of the science communication field is limited by the lack of effective transfer mechanisms for practitioners to apply research in their work and perhaps even investigate, together with researchers, communication strategies, Jensen and Gerber said. Closer collaboration could enrich the spectrum of science communication research and increase the existing methodological toolbox, including more longitudinal and experimental studies.

Evidence-based science communication would combine the best available evidence from systematic research, underpinned by established theory, as well as practitioners' acquired skills and expertise, reducing the double-disconnect between scholarship and practice. Neither adequately take into account the other side's priorities, needs and possible solutions, Jensen and Gerber argued; bridging the gap and fostering closer collaboration could allow for mutual learning, enhancing the overall advancements of science communication as a young field.

=== Imagining science's publics ===
In the preface of The Selfish Gene, Richard Dawkins wrote: "Three imaginary readers looked over my shoulder while I was writing, and I now dedicate the book to them. [...] First the general reader, the layman [...] second the expert [and] third the student".

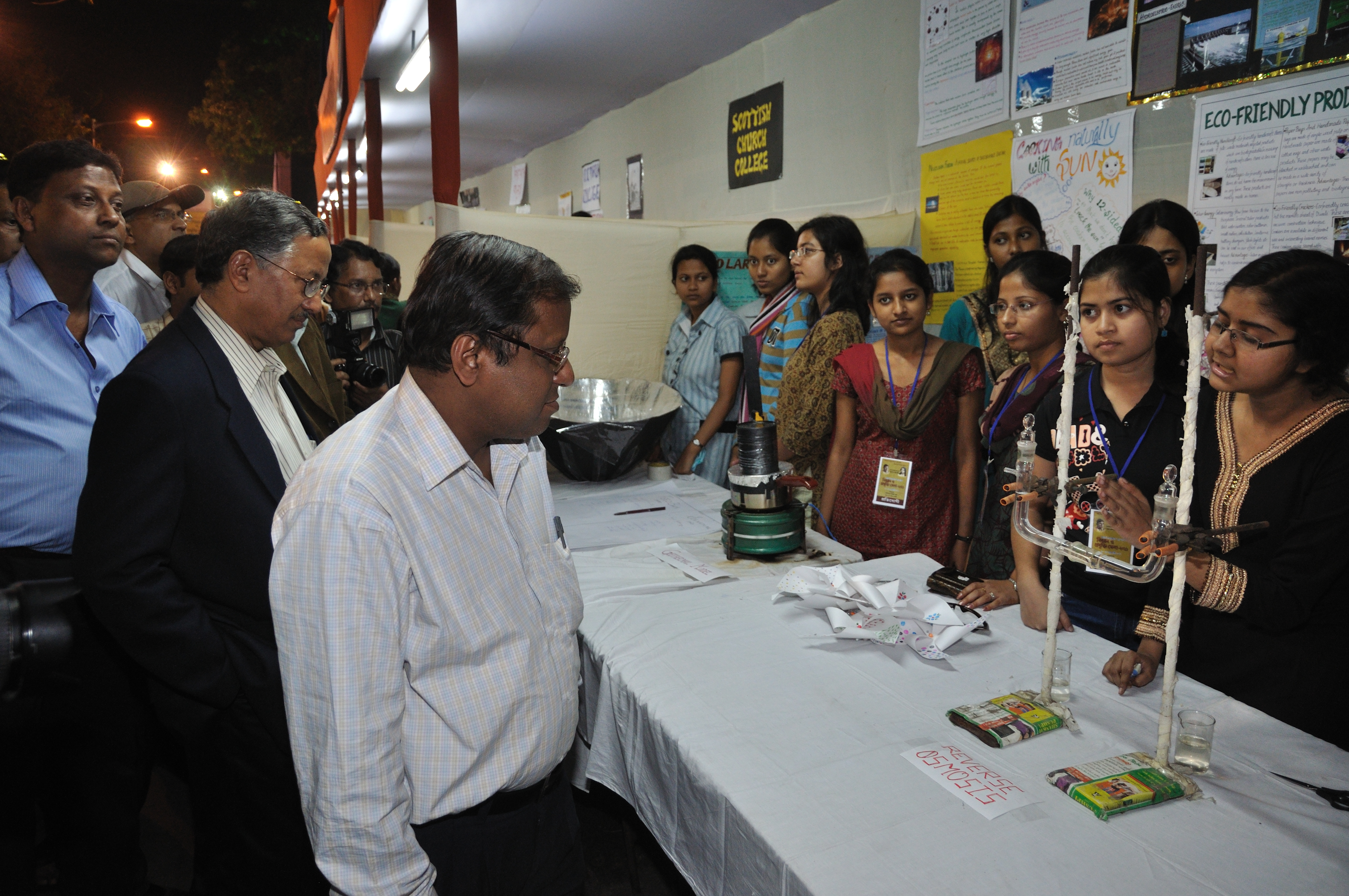
Students explain science projects to visitors. Susanna Hornig promotes the message that anyone can meaningfully engage with science, even without going as deeply into it as the researchers themselves do.

Many criticisms of the public understanding of science movement have emphasized that this thing they were calling the public was somewhat of an (unhelpful) black box. Approaches to the public changed with the move away from the public understanding of science. Science communication researchers and practitioners now often showcase their desire to listen to non-scientists as well as acknowledging an awareness of the fluid and complex nature of (post/late) modern social identities. At the very least, people will use plurals: publics or audiences. As the editor of the scholarly journal Public Understanding of Science put it in a special issue on publics:

We have clearly moved from the old days of the deficit frame and thinking of publics as monolithic to viewing publics as active, knowledgeable, playing multiple roles, receiving as well as shaping science. (Einsiedel, 2007: 5)

However, Einsiedel goes on to suggest both views of the public are "monolithic" in their own way; they both choose to declare what something called the public is. Some promoters of public understanding of science might have ridiculed publics for their ignorance, but an alternative "public engagement with science and technology" romanticizes its publics for their participatory instincts, intrinsic morality or simple collective wisdom. As Susanna Hornig Priest concluded in her 2009 introduction essay on science's contemporary audiences, the job of science communication might be to help non-scientists feel they are not excluded as opposed to always included; that they can join in if they want, rather than that there is a necessity to spend their lives engaging.

The process of quantifiably surveying public opinion of science is now largely associated with the public understanding of science movement (some would say unfairly). In the US, Jon Miller is the name most associated with such work and well known for differentiating between identifiable "attentive" or "interested" publics (that is to say science fans) and those who do not care much about science and technology. Miller's work questioned whether the American public had the following four attributes of scientific literacy:

- knowledge of basic textbook scientific factual knowledge
- an understanding of scientific method
- appreciated the positive outcomes of science and technology
- rejected superstitious beliefs, such as astrology or numerology

In some respects, John Durant's work surveying British public applied similar ideas to Miller. However, they were slightly more concerned with attitudes to science and technology, rather than just how much knowledge people had. They also looked at public confidence in their knowledge, considering issues such as the gender of those ticking "don't know" boxes. We can see aspects of this approach, as well as a more "public engagement with science and technology" influenced one, reflected within the Eurobarometer studies of public opinion. These have been running since 1973 to monitor public opinion in the member states, with the aim of helping the preparation of policy (and evaluation of policy). They look at a host of topics, not just science and technology but also defense, the euro, enlargement of the European Union, and culture. Eurobarometer's 2008 study of Europeans' Attitudes to Climate Change is a good example. It focuses on respondents' "subjective level of information"; asking "personally, do you think that you are well informed or not about...?" rather than checking what people knew.

=== Frame analysis ===
Science communication can be analyzed through frame analysis, a research method used to analyze how people understand situations and activities.

Some features of this analysis are listed below.

- Public accountability: placing a blame on public actions for value, e.g. political gain in the climate change debate
- Runaway technology: creating a certain view of technological advancements, e.g. photos of an exploded nuclear power plant
- Scientific uncertainty: questioning the reliability of a scientific theory, e.g. arguing how bad global climate change can be if humans are still alive

=== Heuristics ===
People make an enormous number of decisions every day, and to approach all of them in a careful, methodical manner is impractical. They therefore often use mental shortcuts known as "heuristics" to quickly arrive at acceptable inferences. Tversky and Kahneman originally proposed three heuristics, listed below, although there are many others that have been discussed in later research.

- Representativeness: used to make assumptions about probability based on relevancy, e.g. how likely item A is to be a member of category B (is Kim a chef?), or that event C resulted from process D (could the sequence of coin tosses H-H-T-T have occurred randomly?).
- Availability: used to estimate how frequent or likely an event is based on how quickly one can conjure examples of the event. For example, if one were asked to approximate the number of people in your age group that are currently in college, your judgment would be affected by how many of your own acquaintances are in college.
- Anchoring and adjustment: used when making judgments with uncertainties. One will start with an anchoring point, then adjust it to reach an assumption. For example, if you are asked to estimate how many people will take Dr. Smith's biology class this spring, you may recall that 38 students took the class in the fall, and adjust your estimation based on whether the class is more popular in the spring or in the fall.

The most effective science communication efforts take into account the role that heuristics play in everyday decision-making. Many outreach initiatives focus solely on increasing the public's knowledge, but studies have found little, if any, correlation between knowledge levels and attitudes towards scientific issues.

=== Inclusive communication and cultural differences ===
Inclusive science communication seeks to build equity by prioritizing communication that is built with and for marginalized groups that are not reached through typical top-down science communication.

Science communication is affected by the same implicit inequities embedded in the production of science research. It has traditionally centered Western science and communicated in Western language. Māori researcher Linda Tuhiwai Smith details how scientific research is "inextricably linked to European imperialism and colonialism". The field's focus on Western science results in publicizing "discoveries" by Western scientists that have been known to Indigenous scientists and communities for generations, continuing the cycle of colonial exploitation of physical and intellectual resources.

Collin Bjork notes that science communication is linked to oppression because European colonizers "employed both the English language and western science as tools for subjugating others". Today, English is still considered the international language of science and 80% of science journals in Scopus are published in English. As a result, most science journalism also communicates in English or must use English sources, limiting the audience that science communication can reach.

Just as science has historically excluded communities of Black, Indigenous and people of color, LGBTQ+ communities and communities of lower socioeconomic status or education, science communication has also failed to center these audiences. Science communication cannot be inclusive or effective if these communities are not involved in both the creation and dissemination of science information. One strategy to improve inclusivity in science communication is by building philanthropic coalitions with marginalized communities.

The 2018 article titled "The Civic Science Imperative" in the Stanford Social Innovation Review (SSIR) outlined how civic science could expand inclusion in science and science communication. Civic science fosters public engagement with science issues so citizens can spur meaningful policy, societal or democratic change. This article outlined the strategies of supporting effective science communication and engagement, building diverse coalitions, building flexibility to meet changing goals, centering shared values, and using research and feedback loops to increase trust. However, the authors of the 2020 SSIR article "How Science Philanthropy Can Build Equity" warned that these approaches will not combat systemic barriers of racism, sexism, ableism, xenophobia or classism without the principles of diversity, equity and inclusion (DEI).

DEI in science communication can take many forms, but will always: include marginalized groups in the goal setting, design and implementation of the science communication; use experts to determine the unique values, needs and communication style of the community being reached; test to determine the best way to reach each segment of a community; and include ways to mitigate harm or stress for community members who engage with this work.

Efforts to make science communication more inclusive can focus on a global, national or local community. The Metcalf Institute for Marine & Environmental Reporting at the University of Rhode Island produced a survey of these practices in 2020. "How Science Philanthropy Can Build Equity" also lists several successful civic science projects and approaches. Complementary methods for including diverse voices include the use of poetry, participatory arts, film, and games, all of which have been used to engage various publics by monitoring, deliberating, and responding to their attitudes toward science and scientific discourse.

== Science in popular culture and the media ==
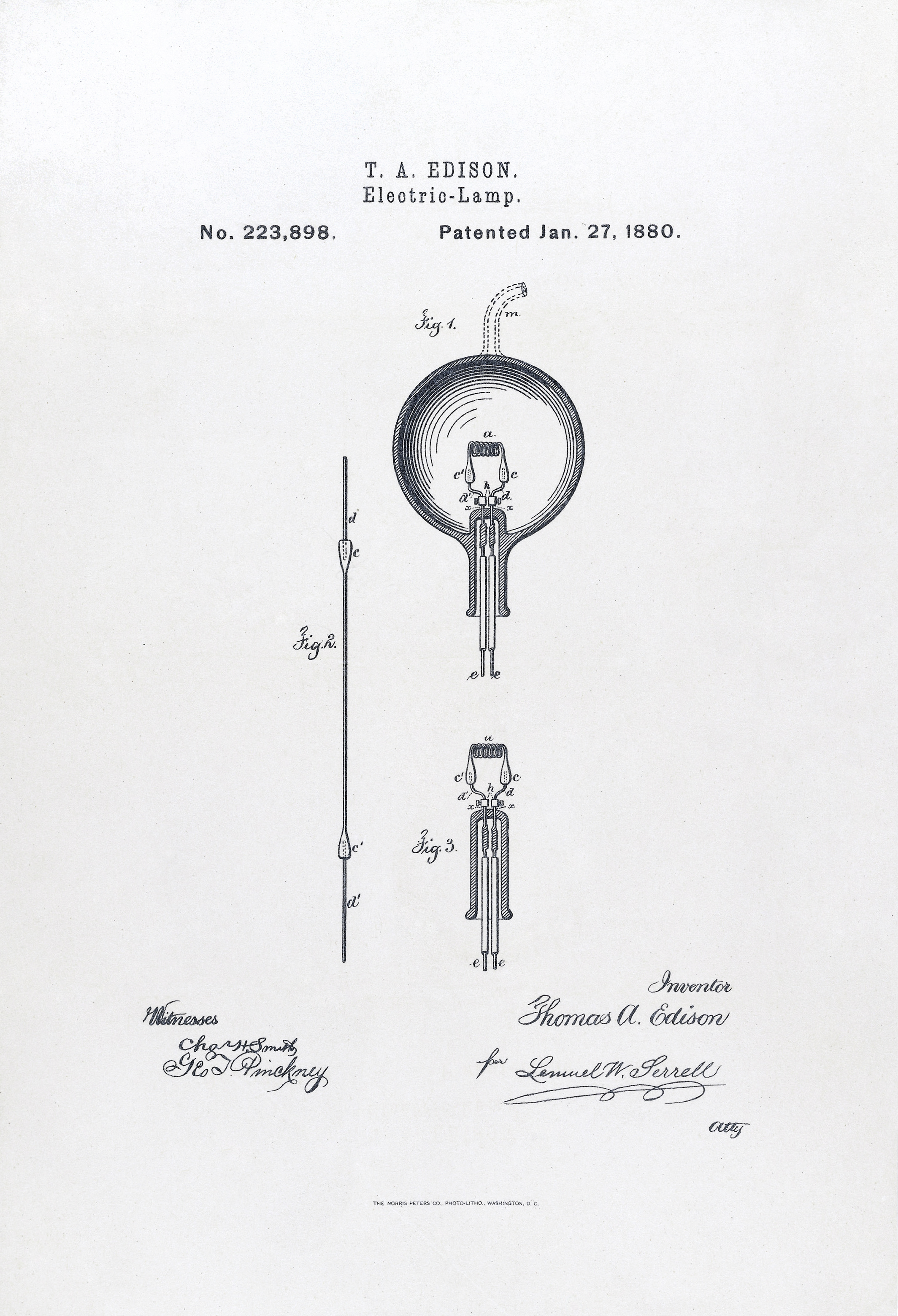
This diagram, designed by Thomas Edison in 1880, is intended to depict the workings of a light bulb.

=== Birth of public science ===
While scientific study began to emerge as a popular discourse following the Renaissance and the Enlightenment, science was not widely funded or exposed to the public until the nineteenth century. Most science prior to this was funded by individuals under private patronage and was studied in exclusive groups, like the Royal Society. Public science emerged due to a gradual social change, resulting from the rise of the middle class in the nineteenth century. As scientific inventions, like the conveyor belt and the steam locomotive entered and enhanced the lifestyle of people in the nineteenth century, scientific inventions began to be widely funded by universities and other public institutions in an effort to increase scientific research. Since scientific achievements were beneficial to society, the pursuit of scientific knowledge resulted in science as a profession. Scientific institutions, like the National Academy of Sciences or the British Association for the Advancement of Science are examples of leading platforms for the public discussion of science. David Brewster, founder of the British Association for the Advancement of Science, believed in regulated publications in order to effectively communicate their discoveries, "so that scientific students may know where to begin their labours." As the communication of science reached a wider audience, due to the professionalization of science and its introduction to the public sphere, the interest in the subject increased.

=== Scientific media in the 19th century ===
There was a change in media production in the nineteenth century. The invention of the steam-powered printing press enabled more pages to be printed per hour, which resulted in cheaper texts. Book prices gradually dropped, which gave the working classes the ability to purchase them. No longer reserved for the elite, affordable and informative texts were made available to a mass audience. Historian Aileen Fyfe noted that, as the nineteenth century experienced a set of social reforms that sought to improve the lives of those in the working classes, the availability of public knowledge was valuable for intellectual growth. As a result, there were reform efforts to further the knowledge of the less educated. The Society for the Diffusion of Useful Knowledge, led by Henry Brougham, attempted to organize a system for widespread literacy for all classes. Additionally, weekly periodicals, like the Penny Magazine, were aimed to educate the general public on scientific achievements in a comprehensive manner.

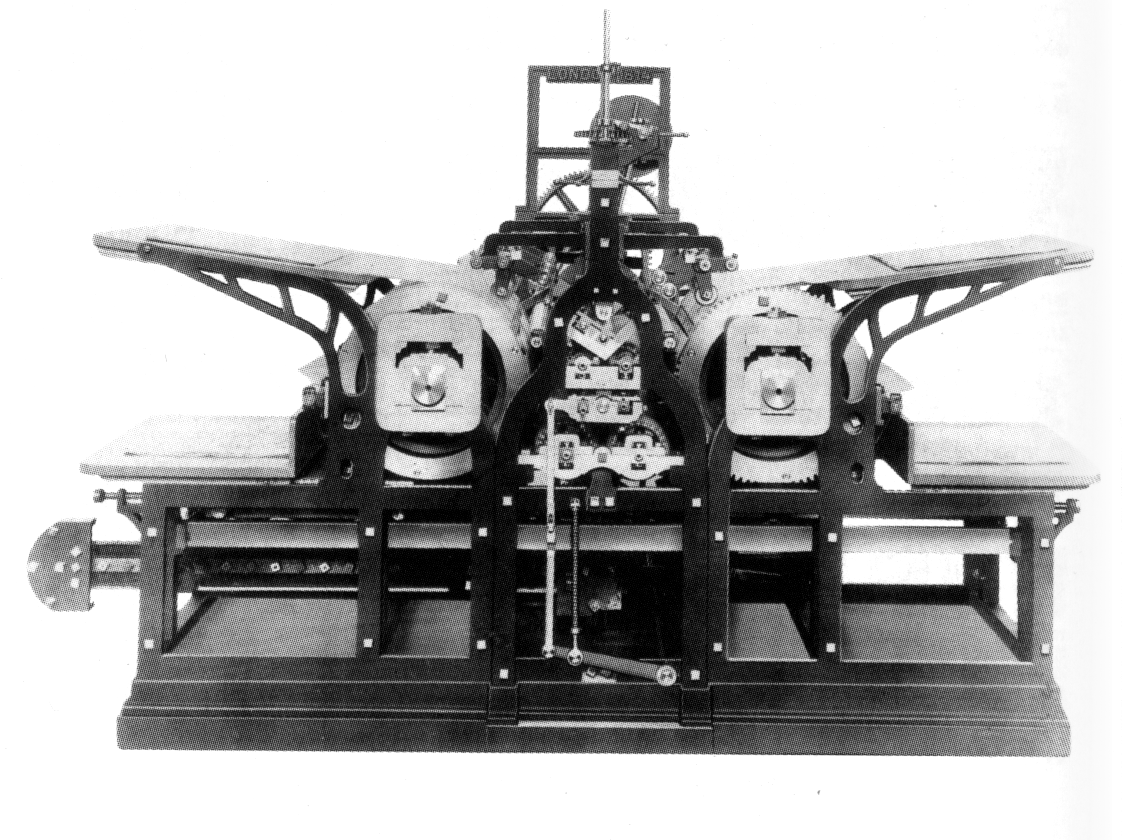
Fredrich Koenig's steam powered printing press, 1814

As the audience for scientific texts expanded, the interest in public science did as well. "Extension lectures" were installed in some universities, like Oxford and Cambridge, which encouraged members of the public to attend lectures. In America, traveling lectures were a common occurrence in the nineteenth century and attracted hundreds of viewers. These public lectures were a part of the lyceum movement and demonstrated basic scientific experiments, which advanced scientific knowledge for both the educated and uneducated viewers.

Not only did the popularization of public science enlighten the general public through mass media, but it also enhanced communication within the scientific community. Although scientists had been communicating their discoveries and achievements through print for centuries, publications with a variety of subjects decreased in popularity. Alternatively, publications in discipline-specific journals were crucial for a successful career in the sciences in the nineteenth century. As a result, scientific journals such as Nature or National Geographic possessed a large readership and received substantial funding by the end of the nineteenth century as the popularization of science continued.

=== Science communication in contemporary media ===
Science can be communicated to the public in many different ways. According to Karen Bultitude, a science communication lecturer at University College London, these can be broadly categorized into three groups: traditional journalism, live or face-to-face events, and online interaction.

==== Traditional journalism ====
Traditional journalism (for example, newspapers, magazines, television and radio) has the advantage of reaching large audiences; in the past, this is way most people regularly accessed information about science. Traditional media is also more likely to produce information that is high quality (well written or presented), as it will have been produced by professional journalists. Traditional journalism is often also responsible for setting agendas and having an impact on government policy. The traditional journalistic method of communication is one-way, so there can be no dialogue with the public, and science stories can often be reduced in scope so that there is a limited focus for a mainstream audience, who may not be able to comprehend the bigger picture from a scientific perspective. However, there is new research now available on the role of newspapers and television channels in constituting "scientific public spheres" which enable participation of a wide range of actors in public deliberations.

Another disadvantage of traditional journalism is that, once a science story is taken up by mainstream media, the scientist(s) involved no longer has any direct control over how his or her work is communicated, which may lead to misunderstanding or misinformation. Research in this area demonstrates how the relationship between journalists and scientists has been strained in some instances. On one hand scientists have reported being frustrated with things like journalists oversimplifying or dramatizing of their work, while on the other hand journalists find scientists difficult to work with and ill-equipped to communicate their work to a general audience. Despite this potential tension, a comparison of scientists from several countries has shown that many scientists are pleased with their media interactions and engage often.

However, the use of traditional media sources, like newspapers and television, has steadily declined as primary sources for science information, while the internet has rapidly increased in prominence. In 2016, 55% of Americans reported using the internet as their primary source to learn about science and technology, compared to 24% reporting TV and 4% reporting newspapers were their primary sources. Additionally, traditional media outlets have dramatically decreased the number of, or in some cases eliminated, science journalists and the amount of science-related content they publish.

==== Live or face-to-face events ====
The second category is live or face-to-face events, such as public lectures in museums or universities, debates, science busking, "sci-art" exhibits, Science Cafés and science festivals. Citizen science or crowd-sourced science (scientific research conducted, in whole or in part, by amateur or nonprofessional scientists) can be done with a face-to-face approach, online, or as a combination of the two to engage in science communication. Research has shown that members of the public seek out science information that is entertaining, but also helping citizens to critically participate in risk regulation and S&T governance. Therefore, it is important to bear this aspect in mind when communicating scientific information to the public (for example, through events combining science communication and comedy, such as Festival of the Spoken Nerd, or during scientific controversies). The advantages of this approach are that it is more personal and allows scientists to interact with the public, allowing for two-way dialogue. Scientists are also better able to control content using this method. Disadvantages of this method include the limited reach, it can also be resource-intensive and costly and also, it may be that only audiences with an existing interest in science will be attracted. Another opportunity for budding science communicators is through FameLab. This programme was created by Cheltenham Festivals in 2005 and is the largest science communication competition and training programme in the world. FameLab discovers, trains and promotes the best new voices in science (including social sciences), technology, engineering and maths. Participants have just three minutes to convey a scientific concept of their choice to an audience and expert panel of judges. The winner is the speaker who best demonstrates FameLab's 3 C's – Content, Clarity and Charisma.

==== Online interaction ====
The third category is online interaction; for example, websites, blogs, wikis and podcasts can be used for science communication, as can other social media or forms of artificial intelligence like AI-Chatbots. Online methods of communicating science have the potential to reach huge audiences, can allow direct interaction between scientists and the public, and the content is always accessible and can be somewhat controlled by the scientist. Additionally, online communication of science can help boost scientists' reputation through increased citations, better circulation of articles, and establishing new collaborations. Online communication also allows for both one-way and two-way communication, depending on the audience's and the author's preferences. However, there are disadvantages in that it is difficult to control how content is picked up by others, and regular attention and updating is needed.

When considering whether or not to engage in science communication online, scientists should review what science communication research has shown to be the potential positive and negative outcomes. Online communication has given rise to movements like open science, which advocates for making science more accessible. However, when engaging in communication about science online, scientists should consider not publicizing or reporting findings from their research until it has been peer-reviewed and published, as journals may not accept the work after it has been circulated under the "Ingelfinger rule".

Other considerations revolve around how scientists will be perceived by other scientists for engaging in communication. For example, some scholars have criticized engaged, popular scholars using concepts like the Sagan effect or Kardashian Index. Despite these criticisms, many scientists are taking to communicating their work on online platforms, a sign of potentially changing norms in the field.

==== Art ====
Warming stripes graphics, which portray annual values of global warming with stripes colored blue (cooler years, historically) and red (hotter years, recently), have been likened to museum artworks. The graphic is purposely devoid of scientific and technical content to communicate intuitively to non-technical people.

According to Lesen et al. (2016), art has been a tool increasingly used to attract the public to science. Either formally or in an informal context, an integration between artists and scientists could potentially raise awareness of the general public about current topics in science, technology, engineering and mathematics (STEM).

The arts have the power of creating emotional links between the public and a research topic and create a collaborative atmosphere that can "activate science" in a different way. Learning through the affection domain, in contrast to the cognitive domain, increases motivation and using the arts to communicate scientific knowledge this way could increase dramatically engagement.

One example is Ed Hawkins's warming stripes graphics which were included in Pirouette: Turning Points in Design, an exhibition of design icons at the Museum of Modern Art highlighting design "as an agent of change".

=== Social media science communication ===
By using Twitter, scientists and science communicators can discuss scientific topics with many types of audiences with various points of view. Studies published in 2012 by Gunther Eysenbach shed light on how Twitter not only communicates science to the public but also affects advances in the science community. However, as of 2024, engagement from academics reduced on Twitter.

Alison Bert, editor in chief of Elsevier Connect, wrote a 2014 news article titled "How to use social media for science" that reported on a panel about social media at that year's AAAS meeting, in which panelists Maggie Koerth-Baker, Kim Cobb, and Danielle N. Lee noted some potential benefits and drawbacks to scientists of sharing their research on Twitter. Koerth-Baker, for example, commented on the importance of keeping public and private personas on social media separate in order to maintain professionalism online.

Interviewed in 2014, Karen Peterson, director of Scientific Career Development at Fred Hutchinson Cancer Research Center stressed the importance for scientists of using social networks such as Facebook and Twitter to establish an online presence.

Kimberly Collins et al., writing in PLOS One in 2016, explained reasons why some scientists were hesitant to join Twitter. Some scientists were hesitant to use social media outlets such as Twitter due to lack of knowledge of the platform, and inexperience with how to make meaningful posts. Some scientists did not see the meaning in using Twitter as a platform to share their research or have the time to add the information into the accounts themselves.

In 2016, Elena Milani created the SciHashtag Project, which is a condensed collection of Twitter hashtags about science communication.

In 2017, a study done by the Pew Research Center found that about "a quarter of social media users (26%) follow science accounts" on social media. This group of users "places both more importance and comparatively more trust on science news that comes to them through social media".

Scientists have also used other social media platforms, including Instagram and Reddit, to establish a connection with the public and discuss science.

== The public understanding of science movement ==
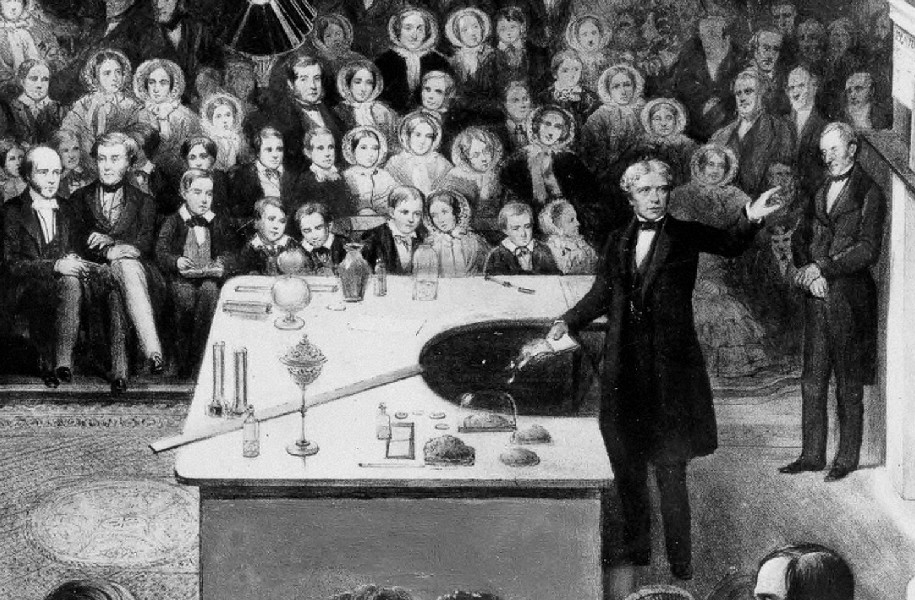
Michael Faraday giving a Christmas Lecture at the Royal Institution (c. 1855)

"Public understanding of science", "public awareness of science" and "public engagement with science and technology" are all terms coined with a movement involving governments and societies in the late 20th century. During the late 19th century, science became a professional subject and influenced by governmental suggestions. Prior to this, public understanding of science was very low on the agenda. However, some well-known figures such as Michael Faraday ran lectures aimed at the non-expert public, his being the famous Christmas Lectures which began in 1825.

The 20th century saw groups founded on the basis they could position science in a broader cultural context and allow scientists to communicate their knowledge in a way that could reach and be understood by the general public. In the UK, The Bodmer Report (or The Public Understanding of Science as it is more formally known) published in 1985 by The Royal Society changed the way scientists communicated their work to the public. The report was designed to "review the nature and extent of the public understanding of science in the United Kingdom and its adequacy for an advanced democracy". Chaired by the geneticist Sir Walter Bodmer alongside famous scientists as well as broadcaster Sir David Attenborough, the report was evidenced by all of the major sectors concerned; scientists, politicians, journalists and industrialists but not the general public. One of the main assumptions drawn from the report was everybody should have some grasp of science and this should be introduced from a young age by teachers who are suitably qualified in the subject area. The report also asked for further media coverage of science including via newspapers and television which has ultimately led to the establishment of platforms such as the Vega Science Trust.

In both the UK and the United States following the Second World War, public views of scientists swayed from great praise to resentment. Therefore, the Bodmer Report highlighted concerns from the scientific community that their withdrawal from society was causing scientific research funding to be weak. Bodmer promoted the communication of science to a wider more general public by expressing to British scientists that it was their responsibility to publicize their research. An upshot of the publication of the report was the creation of the Committee on the Public Understanding of Science (COPUS), a collaboration between the British Association for the Advancement of Science, the Royal Society and the Royal Institution. The engagement between these individual societies caused the necessity for a public understanding of science movement to be taken seriously. COPUS also awarded grants for specific outreach activities allowing the public understanding to come to the fore. Ultimately leading to a cultural shift in the way scientists publicized their work to the wider non-expert community. Although COPUS no longer exists within the UK the name has been adopted in the US by the Coalition on the Public Understanding of Science. An organization which is funded by the US National Academy of Sciences and the National Science Foundation and focuses on popular science projects such as science cafes, festivals, magazines and citizen science schemes.

In the European Union, public views on public-funded research and the role of governmental institutions in funding scientific activities were being questioned as the budget allocated was increasing. Therefore, the European Commission encouraged strongly and later obligated research organizations to communicate about their research activities and results widely and to the general public. This is being done by integrating a communication plan into their research project that increases the public visibility of the project using an accessible language and adapted channels and materials.

== See also ==
- Conversazione
- Hype in science
- List of science communicators
- Public awareness of science
- Science-to-business marketing
