= Interactional expertise =

Part of classification of expertise

Interactional expertise is part of a more complex classification of expertise developed by Harry Collins and Robert Evans (both based at Cardiff University). In this initial formulation interactional expertise was part of a threefold classification of substantive expertise that also included ‘no expertise’ and ‘contributory expertise’, by which they meant the expertise needed to contribute fully to all aspects of a domain of activity.

== Classification ==
The distinction between these three different types of expertise can be illustrated by imagining the experience of a social science researcher approaching a topic for the first time. It is easy to see that, whether the research project is to be about plumbing or physics, most researchers will start from a position of ‘no expertise’ in that area. As the research project proceeds and the social interactions between the researcher and the plumbers or physicists continue, the social researcher will become increasingly knowledgeable about that topic. For example, they will find that they can talk more interestingly about plumbing or physics and ask more pertinent questions about how it works. Eventually, the researcher may even get to the point where they can answer questions about plumbing or physics as though they were a plumber or physicist even though they can’t do plumbing or physics. It is this kind of expertise that Collins and Evans call interactional expertise.

The important thing to note about interactional expertise is that the only thing the social researcher can’t do that a practicing plumber or physicist can do is the practical work of actually installing central heating or conducting experiments. It is this difference – the difference between being able to talk like a plumber/physicist and actually do plumbing/physics – that is the difference between interactional expertise (what the researcher has) and contributory expertise (what the plumbers and physicists have). Of course, plumbers and physicists who can talk fluently about their work will have both kinds of expertise.

In identifying this separate and distinctive kind of linguistic expertise, the idea of interactional expertise makes a clear break with other theories of expertise, particularly those developed in science and technology studies, which tend to see expertise as a social status granted by others rather than a property of the individual. As discussed in more detail below, the idea of interactional expertise also differs from more traditional phenomenological theories of expertise, in which the embodied expertise of the contributory expert is well-recognised but the distinctively linguistic expertise of the interactional expert appears to have been overlooked. In this context, it must be emphasised that interactional expertise is a tacit knowledge-laden ability and thus similar in kind to the more embodied contributory expertise. This means that, like contributory expertise, interactional expertise cannot be acquired from books alone and it cannot be encoded in computerised expert systems. It is a specialised natural language and, as such; it can only be acquired by linguistic interaction with experts. The difference between interactional and contributory expertise is that, in the case of interactional expertise, the tacit knowledge pertains to the language of the domain but not its practice. In the case of contributory expertise, tacit knowledge relating to both the language and practice must be acquired.

== Significance ==
The concept of interactional expertise

1. provides a new way of engaging with traditional problems in the philosophy of knowledge
2. appears to be implicated in a wide range of social activities, ranging from some styles of management in large organisations to high level specialist journalism to the peer review that is at the centre of science.

=== Interactional expertise and philosophy ===
In standard philosophy of knowledge the key distinction is between knowledge that is embodied and knowledge that is formally and explicitly articulated. In this dichotomous formulation, knowledge exists either as codified rules and facts or as some intangible property of the body that performs the task. This distinction forms the basis of the key debate about artificial intelligence research in which Hubert Dreyfus, starting from Heidegger argued that because computers don’t have bodies they can’t do what humans do and will not, therefore, succeed in becoming intelligent, no matter how sophisticated and detailed the knowledge base and rules with which they are programmed (see Dreyfus 1972).

In 1990, Harry Collins developed an alternative critique of AI which, although similar to Dreyfus’s in that it suggested fundamental limits to what AI could achieve, grounded this explanation in an understanding of socialisation rather than embodiment. Collins’s argument was that because computers are asocial objects that cannot be socialised into the life of a community, then they cannot be intelligent. In this sense, Collins is taking the alternative to the 'thinking machine' first proposed by Alan Turing in 1950 (and now known as the Turing test) in which so-called intelligence in a machine is defined as the ability to hold a conversation. In the Turing test, the conversation is conducted via keyboards and the challenge for the AI community is to produce a computer that can give answers that are indistinguishable from those produced by a real human. Given that such interactions are by their very nature open-ended and context-dependent Collins argues that only a fully socialised intelligence will be able to respond appropriately to any of the new and potentially unknown sentences directed to it.

Although the argument was not made in these terms at the time, the concept of interactional expertise is important here. In the original critique of AI research, Collins distinguished between behaviour-specific action (capable of being encoded and reproduced by machines) and natural action (what humans do the rest of the time and which machines cannot reproduce). In a later work with Martin Kusch, this same distinction was re-cast as the distinction as mimeomorphic action (action performed in the same way each time and thus amenable to mechanical reproduction) and polymorphic action (actions that depend on context and local convention for their correct interpretation and continuation and thus not reproducible by machines, however sophisticated).

The link between these arguments, the embodiment debate and the idea of interactional expertise is the importance of natural language. If interactional expertise exists then it suggests that people who cannot perform a particular task or skill – and who therefore cannot have the embodied expertise associated with it – can still talk about that skill as if they did possess the embodied skills. Interactional expertise thus raises a key question about the “amount” of embodiment that is needed for expertise to be transferred. For proponents of the embodiment thesis, quite a lot of embodiment is needed as the expertise resides in the relative position, movement and feel of the body. From the perspective of interactional expertise much less embodiment is needed and, taken to its logical minimum, perhaps only the ability to hear and speak are needed.

=== Interactional expertise and practical action ===
The idea of interactional expertise also has many practical applications and accounts for many everyday practices and activities. The implication of interactional expertise is to legitimate commentary and opinion from individuals outside a group of contributory expertise without necessarily saying that all opinions and views are equally valid. Examples of circumstances in which some degree of interactional expertise would be important include:

==== The role of peer review in science ====
Scientific papers and research are subject to peer review but, in most cases, the reviewers will be drawn from cognate or related fields. This is particularly common in research funding decisions, where the likelihood of an application being reviewed by non-specialists increases with the amount of money involved. Even in the case of smaller awards, and of peer reviewed papers, it is still often the case that reviewers will have contributory expertise in a different narrowly defined specialism to that of the author being reviewed. If interactional expertise did not exist, then justifying peer review would be difficult. If, however, reviewers can have expertise by virtue of their interaction with a range of cognate scientists, then the process of peer review seems reasonable.

==== The management of large organisations ====
Whilst there may be some skills that are more or less generic in the management of large organisations – presumably the kinds of skills that are taught on MBA schemes around the world – we can also ask if managers do better if they understand particularities of the business they are in charge of. Intuitively it seems reasonable to suggest that the manager of a newspaper should know something about how a journalist works or that a manager of a car factory should know something about how a production line works. Whilst this kind of thinking is formally included in many training schemes, the idea of interactional expertise allows us to ask about the kind of experience that is needed in order for managers who lack the embodied experience of writing copy or working on a production line to understand what this is like for those that do fulfil these roles. One implication of interactional expertise is that direct experience – working one’s way up through the ranks – may be less important than previously thought even though lots of interaction with those who do these tasks could still be important. Certainly in the management of large science projects, managers will work hard to acquire interactional expertise quickly.

==== Interdisciplinary trading zones ====
In art, design, science, technology, medicine and public policy many activities are undertaken by interdisciplinary teams. In science and technology, these take the form of scientists and engineers from many different disciplines working together on a single project. It is this situation, in which different groups of specialists with different, mutually incompatible and sometimes incomprehensible ideas nonetheless manage to find a way of communicating with each other and working together that inspired Peter Galison to develop the original trading zones metaphor. Similar teams are often found in public health settings, where cases are decided by multi-disciplinary teams comprising social workers, psychologists, psychiatrists, lawyers and so on. In the trading zone case, these teams work by developing a new composite language, called a pidgin or creole language, which the group shares and uses to communicate. The idea of trading zones has been developed by Mike Gorman, who has identified different types of trading zones, and examined their operation in a range of settings, including nanotechnology. Interactional expertise offers an alternative to this approach. Instead of a new language emerging, some members of the group learn the language of the others and shift back and forth between the two worlds. This is more akin to translation between two cultures rather than the creation of a new, shared, culture.

==== Journalism and the mass media ====
Most journalists cover many different topics in their career but some focus on a specific area, becoming specialist journalists, covering particular beats like politics, medicine, science, environment, security and so on. In the case of science, but in other areas too, the job of journalists is to render the specialist expertise of some esoteric group intelligible and relevant to ordinary folk. In doing so, they interpret events and place them in a broader context. In many cases, journalists do this by presenting ‘both sides of the argument’ in order to provide a balanced story and prevent accusations of bias. This is fine in principle but difficult in practice, particularly for science, as it requires the journalist to make a judgement about how credible a scientific claim is and thus how it should be reported. For example, should it be reported in a balanced way, in which two more or less equal sides get to make contrasting claims, as a story about a fringe, maverick or otherwise highly uncertain claim being made but not widely supported, or simply ignored as nonsense and not reported at all? In the UK, the reporting of the MMR controversy arguably adopted the ‘balanced approach’ for too long, thus lending greater credibility to the claims that MMR was dangerous than they deserved according to most members of the scientific community. In the latter stages of the debate these stories were often produced by the general news journalists and not the specialist health or science journalists who, by virtue of what we might call their interactional expertise, no longer saw the claims as credible.

== See also ==
- Interactive learning – pedagogical approach that incorporates social networking and urban computing into course design and delivery
- Online participation – Extent to which the web encourages the people to share in organizational decision-making
- Research development – Activities designed to aid the attraction of funding and relationships
- Science and technology studies – Academic field
- Science of team science – Field of scientific philosophy and methodology
- Strong programme – School of thought within the sociology of scientific knowledge focused on community
- Trading zones (metaphor) – A shared terminology that allows collaboration between scientists from different paradigms
