= Nature and Culture =

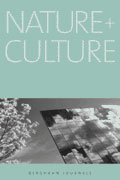
- Discipline: Environmental sociology, environmental studies, cultural studies, Science, technology, and society
- Language: English
- Edited by: Sing C. Chew, Matthias Gross

Publication details
- History: 2005-present
- Publisher: Berghahn Books
- Frequency: Triannually
- Impact factor: 1.931 (2015)

Standard abbreviations
- ISO 4: Nat. Cult.

Indexing
- ISSN: 1558-6073

Links
- Journal homepage

Nature and Culture is a peer-reviewed academic journal published by Berghahn Books that covers the historical and contemporary relationships that societies have with nature. The editors-in-chief are Sing C. Chew and Matthias Gross. The publication themes include cultural reactions and conceptions of nature, ecological restoration, ecological time, as well as political and socio-technical arrangements of landscapes. Some new directions of the journal include environmental technologies and renewable energy cultures.

== Indexing and abstracting ==
Nature and Culture is indexed and abstracted in:

- Abstracts in Anthropology
- Annual Bibliography of English Language and Literature
- Anthropological Index
- British Humanities Index
- International Bibliography of the Social Sciences
- International Bibliography of Periodical Literature
- Sociological Abstracts
- Scopus
- Social Sciences Citation Index
- Current Contents/Social and Behavioral Sciences
- TOC Premier
