= Steven Goldman =

Steven Goldman may refer to:

- Steven L. Goldman (born 1941), professor in humanities at Lehigh University
- Steven M. Goldman, Commissioner of Banking and Insurance of New Jersey, 2006-2009
- Steve Goldman (born 1945), American financial advisor and former gridiron football coach

== See also ==
- Steven Goldmann, Canadian music video and film director
