= Trading zones =

Metaphor applied to collaborations in science

The metaphor of a trading zone is being applied to collaborations in science and technology. The basis of the metaphor is anthropological studies of how different cultures are able to exchange goods, despite differences in language and culture.

== Overview ==
Peter Galison produced the "trading zone" metaphor in order to explain how physicists from different paradigms went about collaborating with each other, and with engineers to develop particle detectors and radar.

According to Galison, "Two groups can agree on rules of exchange even if they ascribe utterly different significance to the objects being exchanged; they may even disagree on the meaning of the exchange process itself. Nonetheless, the trading partners can hammer out a local coordination, despite vast global differences. In an even more sophisticated way, cultures in interaction frequently establish contact languages, systems of discourse that can vary from the most function-specific jargons, through semispecific pidgins, to full-fledged creoles rich enough to support activities as complex as poetry and metalinguistic reflection" (Galison 1997, p. 783)

In the case of radar, for example, the physicists and engineers had to gradually develop what was effectively a pidgin or creole language involving shared concepts like ‘equivalent circuits’ that the physicists represented symbolically in terms of field theory and the engineers saw as extensions of their radio toolkit.

=== Exchange via an "agent" ===
Exchanges across disciplinary boundaries can also be carried out with the help of an agent: namely, a person who is familiar enough with the language of two or more cultures to facilitate trade.

At one point in the development of MRI, surgeons saw a lesion where an engineer familiar with the device would have recognized an artifact produced by the way the device was being used. It took someone with expertise in both physics and surgery to see how each of the different disciplines viewed the device, and develop procedures for correcting the problem (Baird & Cohen, 1999). The ability to converse expertly in more than one discipline is called interactional expertise (Collins & Evans, 2002).

== Areas of application ==
- The U.S. National Nanotechnology Initiative calls for a “broadly inclusive interdisciplinary dialogue on nanotechnology” that would incorporate a wide range of stakeholders (). This kind of a dialogue will require developing creoles that allow different stakeholders to communicate, and also interactional expertise (Gorman, Groves, & Catalano, 2004).
- The convergence between nano, bio, information and cognitive technologies will set an even greater premium on the development of trading zones and interactional expertise (Gorman, 2004).
- Computer science education requires development of trading zones between experts in the social and learning sciences and computer scientists (Fincher & Petre, 2004). Each of these communities uses different methods and speaks a different language, hence the need for a creole and also for interactional experts.
- Managing environmental systems like the Everglades also requires the development of trading zones (). Brad Allenby suggests the development of a new kind of expertise in Earth Systems Engineering and Management, which will include an interactional component (Allenby, 2005).

A workshop at Arizona State University on Trading Zones, Interactional Expertise and Interdisciplinary Collaboration raised the possibility of applying these concepts to other applications like global health and service science, and also identified avenues for future research.

== See also ==
- Boundary object – Sociology of information science
- Boundary-work – Study of boundaries between disciplines
- Creole language – Stable natural languages that have developed from a pidgin
- Interactional expertise – Part of classification of expertise
- Language contact – Interaction between different languages
- Lingua franca – Concept in linguistics
- Pidgin – Simplified language
- Science and technology studies – Academic field
