= Science and technology studies =

Academic field

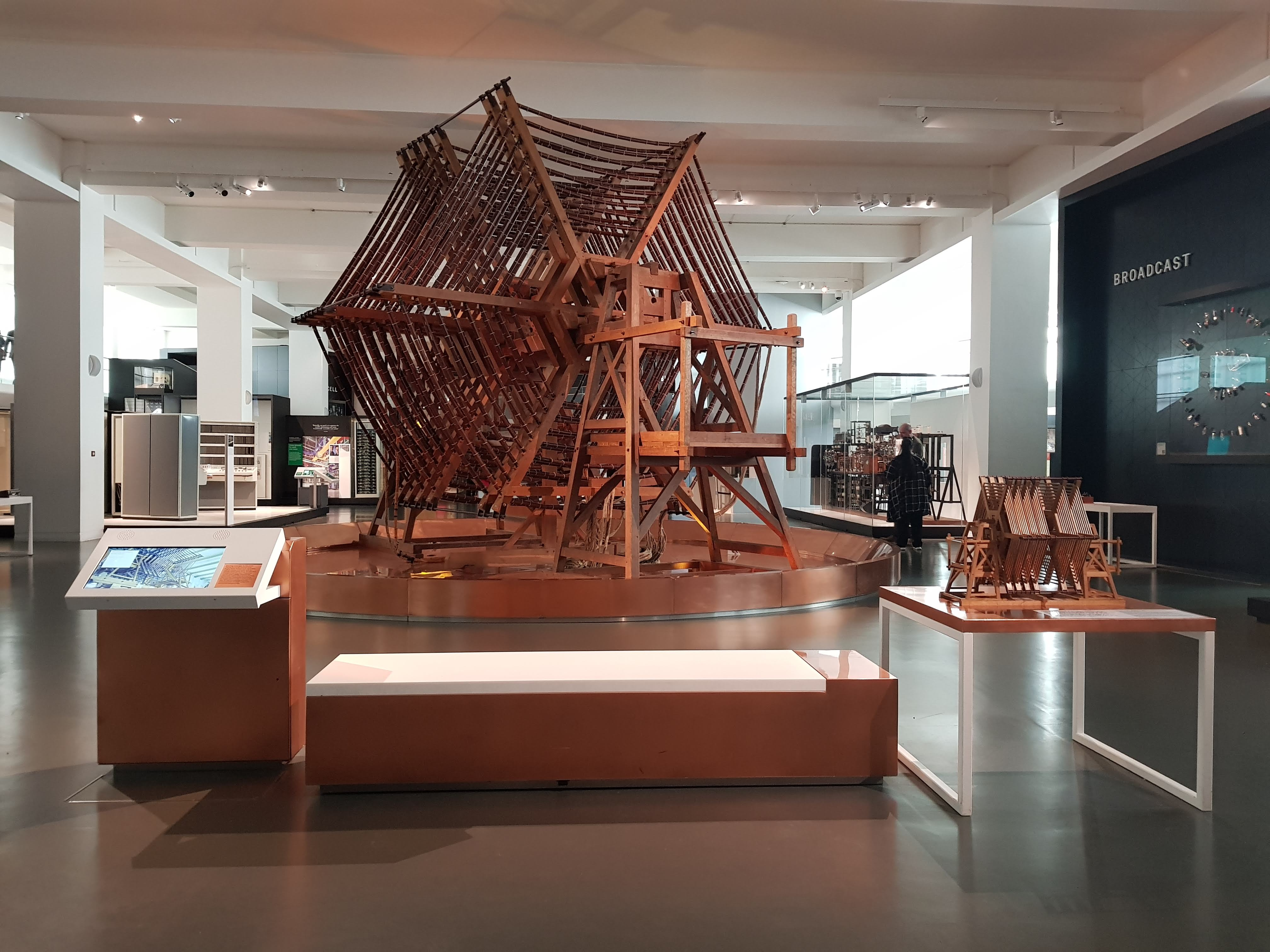
A communications artifact (Rugby Aerial Tuning Inductor) at the Science Museum, London, UK.

Science and technology studies (STS) or science, technology, and society is an interdisciplinary field by sociologists, historians, philosophers, anthropologists, and others that examines the creation, development, consequences, and outcomes of science, including medical science, and technology in their historical, cultural, and social contexts.

== History ==
Like most interdisciplinary fields of study, STS emerged from the confluence of disciplines and disciplinary subfields, all of which had developed an interest—typically, during the 1960s or 1970s—in viewing science and technology as socially embedded enterprises. The key disciplinary components of STS took shape independently, beginning in the 1960s, and developed in isolation from each other well into the 1980s, although Ludwik Fleck's (1935) monograph Genesis and Development of a Scientific Fact anticipated many of STS's key themes. In the 1970s Elting E. Morison founded the STS program at the Massachusetts Institute of Technology (MIT), which served as a model. By 2011, 111 STS research centers and academic programs were counted worldwide.

=== Important key points ===
- History of technology, that examines technology in its social and historical context. Starting in the 1960s, some historians questioned technological determinism, a doctrine that can induce public passivity to technologic and scientific "natural" development. At the same time, some historians began to develop similarly contextual approaches to the history of medicine. Notable historians of medicine who approach the field from a science and technology studies perspective include Robert N. Proctor.
- History and philosophy of science (1960s). After the publication of Thomas Kuhn's well-known The Structure of Scientific Revolutions (1962), which attributed changes in scientific theories to changes in underlying intellectual paradigms, programs were founded at the University of California, Berkeley and elsewhere that brought historians of science and philosophers together in unified programs.
- Science, technology, and society. In the mid-to-late-1960s, student and faculty social movements in the U.S., UK, and European universities helped to launch a range of new interdisciplinary fields (such as women's studies) that were seen to address relevant topics that the traditional curriculum ignored. One such development was the rise of "science, technology, and society" programs, which are also—confusingly—known by the STS acronym. Drawn from a variety of disciplines, including anthropology, history, political science, and sociology, scholars in these programs created undergraduate curricula devoted to exploring the issues raised by science and technology. Feminist scholars in this and other emerging STS areas addressed themselves to the exclusion of women from science and engineering, focusing instead on critiquing gendered power dynamics in prior STS research.
- Science, engineering, and public policy studies emerged in the 1970s from the same concerns that motivated the founders of the science, technology, and society movement: A sense that science and technology were developing in ways that were increasingly at odds with the public's best interests. The science, technology, and society movement tried to humanize those who would make tomorrow's science and technology, but this discipline took a different approach: It would train students with the professional skills needed to become players in science and technology policy. Some programs came to emphasize quantitative methodologies, and most of these were eventually absorbed into systems engineering. Others emphasized sociological and qualitative approaches, and found that their closest kin could be found among scholars in science, technology, and society departments.

During the 1970s and 1980s, universities in the US, UK, and Europe began drawing these various components together in new, interdisciplinary programs. For example, in the 1970s, Cornell University developed a new program that united science studies and policy-oriented scholars with historians and philosophers of science and technology. Each of these programs developed unique identities due to variations in the components that were drawn together, as well as their location within the various universities. For example, the University of Virginia's STS program united scholars drawn from a variety of fields (with particular strength in the history of technology); however, the program's teaching responsibilities—it is located within an engineering school and teaches ethics to undergraduate engineering students—means that all of its faculty share a strong interest in engineering ethics.

=== The "turn to technology" (and beyond) ===
A decisive moment in the development of STS was the mid-1980s addition of technology studies to the range of interests reflected in science. During that decade, two works appeared en seriatim that signaled what Steve Woolgar was to call the "turn to technology". In a seminal 1984 article, Trevor Pinch and Wiebe Bijker showed how the sociology of technology could proceed along the theoretical and methodological lines established by the sociology of scientific knowledge. This was the intellectual foundation of the field they called the social construction of technology. Donald MacKenzie and Judy Wajcman primed the pump by publishing a collection of articles attesting to the influence of society on technological design (Social Shaping of Technology, 1985). Social science research continued to interrogate STS research from this point onward as researchers moved from post-modern to post-structural frameworks of thought, Bijker and Pinch contributing to SCOT knowledge and Wajcman providing boundary work through a feminist lens.

The "turn to technology" helped to cement an already growing awareness of underlying unity among the various emerging STS programs. More recently, there has been an associated turn to ecology, nature, and materiality in general, whereby the socio-technical and natural/material co-produce each other. This is especially evident in work in STS analyses of biomedicine (such as Carl May and Annemarie Mol) and ecological interventions (such as Bruno Latour, Sheila Jasanoff, Matthias Gross, Sara B. Pritchard, and S. Lochlann Jain). Ruth Schwartz Cowan has studied how gender and technology co-produce each other.

== Important concepts ==
=== Social construction(s) ===
Social constructions are human-created ideas, objects, or events created by a series of choices and interactions. These interactions have consequences that change the perception that different groups of people have on these constructs. Some examples of social construction include class, race, money, and citizenship.

The following also alludes to the notion that not everything is set, a circumstance or result could potentially be one way or the other. According to the article "What is Social Construction?" by Ian Hacking, "Social construction work is critical of the status quo. Social constructionists about X tend to hold that:

1. X need not have existed, or need not be at all as it is. X, or X as it is at present, is not determined by the nature of things; it is not inevitable

Very often they go further, and urge that:

1. X is quite as bad as it is.
2. We would be much better off if X were done away with, or at least radically transformed."

In the past, there have been viewpoints that were widely regarded as fact until being called to question due to the introduction of new knowledge. Such viewpoints include the past concept of a correlation between intelligence and the nature of a human's ethnicity or race (X may not be at all as it is).

An example of the evolution and interaction of various social constructions within science and technology can be found in the development of both the high-wheel bicycle, or velocipede, and then of the bicycle. The velocipede was widely used in the latter half of the 19th century. In the latter half of the 19th century, a social need was first recognized for a more efficient and rapid means of transportation. Consequently, the velocipede was first developed, which was able to reach higher translational velocities than the smaller non-geared bicycles of the day, by replacing the front wheel with a larger radius wheel. One notable trade-off was a certain decreased stability leading to a greater risk of falling. This trade-off resulted in many riders getting into accidents by losing balance while riding the bicycle or being thrown over the handlebars.

The first "social construction" or progress of the velocipede caused the need for a newer "social construction" to be recognized and developed into a safer bicycle design. Consequently, the velocipede was then developed into what is now commonly known as the "bicycle" to fit within society's newer "social construction," the newer standards of higher vehicle safety. Thus the popularity of the modern geared bicycle design came as a response to the first social construction, the original need for greater speed, which had caused the high-wheel bicycle to be designed in the first place. The popularity of the modern geared bicycle design ultimately ended the widespread use of the velocipede itself, as eventually it was found to best accomplish the social needs/social constructions of both greater speed and of greater safety.

=== Material semiotics ===
With methodology from actor-network theory (ANT), feminist STS theorists built upon SCOT's theory of co-construction to explore the relationship between gender and technology, proposing one cannot exist separately from the other. This approach suggests the material and social are not separate, reality being produced through interactions and studied through representations of those realities. Building on Steve Woolgar's boundary work on user configuration, feminist critiques shifted the focus away from users of technology and science towards whether technology and science represent a fixed, unified reality. According to this approach, identity could no longer be treated as causal in human interactions with technology as it cannot exist prior to that interaction, feminist STS researchers proposing a "double-constructivist" approach to account for this contradiction. John Law credits feminist STS scholars for contributing material-semiotic approaches to the broader discipline of STS, stating that research not only attempts to describe reality, but enacts it through the research process.

=== Sociotechnical imaginaries (STIs) ===
Sociotechnical imaginaries are what certain communities, societies, and nations envision as achievable through the combination of scientific innovation and social changes. These visions can be based on what is possible to achieve for a certain society, and can also show what a certain state or nation desires. STIs are often bound with ideologies and ambitions of those who create and circulate them. Sociotechnical imaginaries can be created by states and policymakers, smaller groups within society, or can be a result of the interaction of both.

The term was coined in 2009 by Sheila Jasanoff and Sang-Hyun Kim who compared and contrasted sociotechnical imaginaries of nuclear energy in the USA with those of South Korea over the second half of the 20th century. Jasanoff and Kim analyzed the discourse of government representatives, national policies, and civil society organizations, looked at the technological and infrastructural developments, and social protests, and conducted interviews with experts. They concluded that in South Korea nuclear energy was imagined mostly as the means of national development, while in the US the dominant sociotechnical imaginary framed nuclear energy as risky and in need of containment.

The concept has been applied to several objects of study including biomedical research, nanotechnology development and energy systems and climate change. Within energy systems, research has focused on nuclear energy, fossil fuels, renewables as well as broader topics of energy transitions, and the development of new technologies to address climate change.

=== Sociotechnical systems theory ===
Social technical systems are an interplay between technologies and humans, this is clearly expressed in the sociotechnical systems theory. To expound on this interplay, humans fulfill and define tasks, then humans in companies use IT and IT supports people, and finally, IT processes tasks and new IT generates new tasks. This IT redefines work practices. This is what we call the sociotechnical systems. In socio-technical systems, there are two principles to internalize, that is joint optimization and complementarity. Joint optimization puts an emphasis on developing both systems in parallel and it is only in the interaction of both systems that the success of an organization arises. The principle of complementarity means that both systems have to be optimized. If you focus on one system and have bias over the other it will likely lead to the failure of the organization or jeopardize the success of a system. Although the above socio-technical system theory is focused on an organization, it is undoubtedly imperative to correlate this theory and its principles to society today and in science and technology studies. Understanding technology in the context of national development: critical reflections discusses how governance frameworks, digital infrastructure, and institutional capacity influence the societal outcomes of technology adoption.

According to Barley and Bailey, there is a tendency for AI designers and scholars of design studies to privilege the technical over the social, focusing more on taking "humans out of the loop" paradigm than the "augmented intelligence" paradigm.

Recent work on artificial intelligence considers large sociotechnical systems, such as social networks and online marketplaces, as agents whose behavior can be purposeful and adaptive. The behavior of recommender systems can therefore be analyzed in the language and framework of sociotechnical systems, leading also to a new perspective for their legal regulation.

=== Technoscience ===
Technoscience is a subset of Science, Technology, and Society studies that focuses on the inseparable connection between science and technology. It states that fields are linked and grow together, and scientific knowledge requires an infrastructure of technology in order to remain stationary or move forward. Both technological development and scientific discovery drive one another towards more advancement. Technoscience excels at shaping human thoughts and behavior by opening up new possibilities that gradually or quickly come to be perceived as necessities.

=== Technosocial ===
"Technological action is a social process." Social factors and technology are intertwined so that they are dependent upon each other. This includes the aspect that social, political, and economic factors are inherent in technology and that social structure influences what technologies are pursued. In other words, "technoscientific phenomena combined inextricably with social/political/economic/psychological phenomena, so 'technology' includes a spectrum of artifacts, techniques, organizations, and systems." Winner expands on this idea by saying "in the late twentieth-century technology and society, technology and culture, technology and politics are by no means separate."

==== Examples ====
- Ford Pinto – Ford Motor Company sold and produced the Pinto during the 1970s. A flaw in the automobile design of the rear gas tank caused a fiery explosion upon impact. The exploding fuel tank killed and injured hundreds of people. Internal documents of test results proved Ford CEO Lee Iacocca and engineers were aware of the flaw. The company decided to ignore improving its technology because of profit-driven motives, strict internal control, and competition from foreign competitors such as Volkswagen. Ford Motor Company conducted a cost-benefit analysis to determine if altering the Ford Pinto model was feasible. An analysis conducted by Ford employees argued against a new design because of increased cost. Employees were also under tight control by the CEO who rushed the Pinto through production lines to increase profits. Ford finally changed after public scrutiny. Safety organizations later influenced this technology by requiring stricter safety standards for motor vehicles.
- DDT/toxins – DDT was a common and highly effective insecticide used during the 1940s until its ban in the early 1970s. It was utilized during World War 2 to combat insect-borne human diseases that plagued military members and civilian populations. People and companies soon realized other benefits of DDT for agricultural purposes. Rachel Carson became worried about widespread use on public health and the environment. Rachel Carson's book Silent Spring left an imprint on the industry by claiming the linkage of DDT to many serious illnesses such as cancer. Carson's book drew criticism from chemical companies who felt their reputation and business threatened by such claims. DDT was eventually banned by the United States Environmental Protection Agency (EPA) after a long and arduous process of research on the chemical substance. The main cause for the removal of DDT was the public deciding that any benefits were outweighed by the potential health risk.
- Autopilots/computer-aided tasks (CATs) – From a security point of view the effects of making a task more computer-driven is in the favor of technological advance because there is less reaction time required and computational error than a human pilot. Due to reduced error and reaction times flights on average, using autopilot, have been shown to be safer. Thus technology has a direct impact on people by increasing their safety, and society affects technology because people want to be safer so they are constantly trying to improve the autopilot systems.
- Cell phones – Cell phone technology emerged in the early 1920s after advancements were made in radio technology. Engineers at Bell Laboratories, the research, and development division of AT&T discovered that cell towers can transmit and receive signals to and from many directions. The discovery by Bell Labs revolutionized the capabilities and outcomes of cellular technology. Technology only improved once mobile phone users could communicate outside of a designated area. First-generation mobile phones were first created and sold by Motorola. Their phone was only intended for use in cars. Second-generation mobile phone capabilities continued to improve because of the switch to digital. Phones were faster which enhanced the communication capabilities of customers. They were also sleeker and weighed less than bulky first-generation technology. Technological advances boosted customer satisfaction and broadened cell phone companies' customer base. Third-generation technology changed the way people interact with others. Now customers had access to Wi-Fi, texting and other applications. Mobile phones are now entering into the fourth generation. Cellular and mobile phones revolutionized the way people socialize and communicate in order to establish a modern social structure. People have affected the development of this technology by demanding features such as larger screens, touch capabilities, and internet accessibility.
- Internet – The internet arose because of extensive research on ARPANET between various universities, corporations, and ARPA (Advanced Research Project Agency), an agency of the Department of Defense. Scientists theorized a network of computers connected to each other. Computing capabilities contributed to developments and the creation of the modern-day computer or laptop. The internet has become a normal part of life and business, to such a degree that the United Nations views it as a basic human right. The internet is becoming larger, one way is that more things are being moved into the digital world due to demand, for example, online banking. It has drastically changed the way most people go about daily habits.

=== Deliberative democracy ===
Deliberative democracy is a reform of representative or direct democracies which mandates discussion and debate of popular topics which affect society. Deliberative democracy is a tool for making decisions. Deliberative democracy can be traced back all the way to Aristotle's writings. More recently, the term was coined by Joseph Bessette in his 1980 work Deliberative Democracy: The Majority Principle in Republican Government, where he uses the idea in opposition to the elitist interpretations of the United States Constitution with emphasis on public discussion.

Deliberative democracy can lead to more legitimate, credible, and trustworthy outcomes. Deliberative democracy allows for "a wider range of public knowledge", and it has been argued that this can lead to "more socially intelligent and robust" science. One major shortcoming of deliberative democracy is that many models insufficiently ensure critical interaction.

According to Ryfe, there are five mechanisms that stand out as critical to the successful design of deliberative democracy:

- Rules of equality, civility, and inclusivity may prompt deliberation even when our first impulse is to avoid it.
- Stories anchor reality by organizing experience and instilling a normative commitment to civic identities and values, and function as a medium for framing discussions.
- Leadership provides important cues to individuals in deliberative settings and can keep groups on a deliberative track when their members slip into routine and habit.
- Individuals are more likely to sustain deliberative reasoning when they have a stake in the outcomes.
- Apprenticeship teaches citizens to deliberate well. We might do well to imagine education as a form of apprenticeship learning, in which individuals learn to deliberate by doing it in concert with others more skilled in the activity.

==== Importance ====
Recently, there has been a movement towards greater transparency in the fields of policy and technology. Jasanoff comes to the conclusion that there is no longer a question of if there needs to be increased public participation in making decisions about science and technology, but now there need to be ways to make a more meaningful conversation between the public and those developing the technology.

==== In practice ====
Bruce Ackerman and James S. Fishkin offered an example of a reform in their paper "Deliberation Day." The deliberation is to enhance public understanding of popular, complex and controversial issues through devices such as Fishkin's deliberative polling, though implementation of these reforms is unlikely in a large government such as that of the United States. However, things similar to this have been implemented in small, local governments like New England towns and villages. New England town hall meetings are a good example of deliberative democracy in a realistic setting.

An ideal deliberative democracy balances the voice and influence of all participants. While the main aim is to reach consensus, deliberative democracy should encourage the voices of those with opposing viewpoints, concerns due to uncertainties, and questions about assumptions made by other participants. It should take its time and ensure that those participating understand the topics on which they debate. Independent managers of debates should also have a substantial grasp of the concepts discussed, but must "[remain] independent and impartial as to the outcomes of the process."

=== Tragedy of the commons ===
In 1968, Garrett Hardin popularised the phrase "tragedy of the commons." It is an economic theory where rational people act against the best interest of the group by consuming a common resource. Since then, the tragedy of the commons has been used to symbolize the degradation of the environment whenever many individuals use a common resource. Although Garrett Hardin was not an STS scholar, the concept of the tragedy of the commons still applies to science, technology, and society.

In a contemporary setting, the Internet acts as an example of the tragedy of the commons through the exploitation of digital resources and private information. Data and internet passwords can be stolen much more easily than physical documents. Virtual spying is almost free compared to the costs of physical spying. Additionally, net neutrality can be seen as an example of tragedy of the commons in an STS context. The movement for net neutrality argues that the Internet should not be a resource that is dominated by one particular group, specifically those with more money to spend on Internet access.

A counterexample to the tragedy of the commons is offered by Andrew Kahrl. Privatization can be a way to deal with the tragedy of the commons. However, Kahrl suggests that the privatization of beaches on Long Island, in an attempt to combat the overuse of Long Island beaches, made the residents of Long Island more susceptible to flood damage from Hurricane Sandy. The privatization of these beaches took away from the protection offered by the natural landscape. Tidal lands that offer natural protection were drained and developed. This attempt to combat the tragedy of the commons by privatization was counter-productive. Privatization actually destroyed the public good of natural protection from the landscape.

=== Alternative modernity ===
Alternative modernity is a conceptual tool conventionally used to represent the state of present western society. Modernity represents the political and social structures of society, the sum of interpersonal discourse, and ultimately a snapshot of society's direction at a point in time. Unfortunately, conventional modernity is incapable of modeling alternative directions for further growth within our society. Also, this concept is ineffective at analyzing similar but unique modern societies such as those found in the diverse cultures of the developing world. Problems can be summarized into two elements: inward failure to analyze the growth potentials of a given society, and outward failure to model different cultures and social structures and predict their growth potentials.

Previously, modernity carried a connotation of the current state of being modern, and its evolution through European colonialism. The process of becoming "modern" is believed to occur in a linear, pre-determined way, and is seen by Philip Brey as a way to interpret and evaluate social and cultural formations. This thought ties in with modernization theory, the thought that societies progress from "pre-modern" to "modern" societies.

Within the field of science and technology, there are two main lenses with which to view modernity. The first is as a way for society to quantify what it wants to move towards. In effect, we can discuss the notion of "alternative modernity" (as described by Andrew Feenberg) and which of these we would like to move towards. Alternatively, modernity can be used to analyze the differences in interactions between cultures and individuals. From this perspective, alternative modernities exist simultaneously, based on differing cultural and societal expectations of how a society (or an individual within society) should function. Because of different types of interactions across different cultures, each culture will have a different modernity.

=== Pace of innovation ===
The pace of innovation is the speed at which technological innovation or advancement is occurring, with the most apparent instances being too slow or too rapid. Both these rates of innovation are extreme and therefore have effects on the people that get to use this technology.

=== No innovation without representation ===
"No innovation without representation" is a democratic ideal of ensuring that everyone involved gets a chance to be represented fairly in technological developments.

- Langdon Winner states that groups and social interests likely to be affected by a particular kind of technological change ought to be represented at an early stage in defining exactly what that technology will be. It is the idea that relevant parties have a say in technological developments and are not left in the dark.
- Spoken about by Massimiano Bucchi
- This ideal does not require the public to become experts on the topics of science and engineering, it only asks that the opinions and ideas be heard before making drastic decisions, as talked about by Steven L. Goldman.

=== Legacy thinking ===
Legacy thinking is defined as an inherited method of thinking imposed from an external source without objection by the individual because it is already widely accepted by society.

Legacy thinking can impair the ability to drive technology for the betterment of society by blinding people to innovations that do not fit into their accepted model of how society works. By accepting ideas without questioning them, people often see all solutions that contradict these accepted ideas as impossible or impractical. Legacy thinking tends to advantage the wealthy, who have the means to project their ideas on the public. It may be used by the wealthy as a vehicle to drive technology in their favor rather than for the greater good.

Examining citizen participation and political representation provides an important example of legacy thinking. In this context, legacy thinking refers to the acceptance of established political practices, including the belief that financial resources can be used to gain political influence. This belief has contributed to the acceptance of corporate lobbying and has helped create a political environment in which corporations with substantial financial resources can exert significant influence over public policy. Such an imbalance can hinder political progress by giving corporate interests greater opportunities to influence government decisions while limiting the influence of ordinary citizens. However, public dissatisfaction with this imbalance is evident in a Harris Interactive poll, which found that more than 80% of Americans believed that big business had too much power and influence in Washington. These findings suggest growing public concern about the influence of corporate interests in government and highlight the importance of increasing citizen participation in political decision-making.

Additionally, an examination of net neutrality functions as a separate example of legacy thinking. Starting with dial-up, Internet access has historically been treated as a commercial service rather than a public utility. Internet today is a vital part of modern-day society members, becoming increasingly integrated into everyday activities. Critics have also raised concerns about the pricing and classification of internet services. Since the American public is so dependent upon the internet, there is little for them to do. Legacy thinking has kept this pattern on track despite growing movements arguing that the internet should be considered a public utility. This prevents progress because it was widely accepted by others before us through advertising the internet as a luxury and not a public utility. Due to pressure from grassroots movements, the Federal Communications Commission (FCC) has redefined the requirements for broadband and internet in general as a utility. Now, AT&T and other major internet providers are lobbying against this action and are in large able to delay the onset of this movement due to legacy thinking's grip on American culture and politics.

For example, those who cannot overcome the barrier of legacy thinking may not consider the privatization of clean drinking water as an issue. This is partial because access to water has become such a given fact of the matter to them. For a person living in such circumstances, it may be widely accepted to not concern themselves with drinking water because they have not needed to be concerned with it in the past. Additionally, a person living within an area that does not need to worry about their water supply or the sanitation of their water supply is less likely to be concerned with the privatization of water.

This notion can be examined through the thought experiment of "veil of ignorance". Legacy thinking causes people to be particularly ignorant about the implications behind the "you get what you pay for" mentality applied to a life necessity. By utilizing the "veil of ignorance", one can overcome the barrier of legacy thinking as it requires a person to imagine that they are unaware of their own circumstances, allowing them to free themselves from externally imposed thoughts or widely accepted ideas.

== Related concepts ==
- Technoscience – The perception that science and technology are intertwined and depend on each other.
- Technosociety – An industrially developed society with a reliance on technology.
- Technological utopianism – A positive outlook on the effect technology has on social welfare. Includes the perception that technology will one day enable society to reach a utopian state.
- Technosocial systems – people and technologies that combine to work as heterogeneous but functional wholes.
- Critical Technical Practice – the practice of technological creation while simultaneously critiquing and maintaining awareness of the inherent biases and value systems which become embedded in those technologies.

== Classifications ==
- Technological optimism – The opinion that technology has positive effects on society and should be used in order to improve the welfare of people.
- Technological pessimism – The opinion that technology has negative effects on society and should be discouraged from use.
- Technological neutrality – "maintains that a given technology has no systematic effects on society: individuals are perceived as ultimately responsible, for better or worse, because technologies are merely tools people use for their own ends."
- Technological determinism – "maintains that technologies are understood as simply and directly causing particular societal outcomes."
- Scientism – The belief in the total separation of facts and values.
- Technological progressivism – technology is a means to an end itself and an inherently positive pursuit.

== Academic programs ==
STS is taught in several countries. According to the STS wiki, STS programs can be found in twenty countries, including 45 programs in the United States, three programs in India, and eleven programs in the UK. STS programs can be found in Canada, Germany, Israel, Malaysia, and Taiwan. Some examples of institutions offering STS programs are Stanford University, University College London, Harvard University, the University of Oxford, Mines ParisTech, Bar-Ilan University, and York University. In Europe the European Inter-University Association on Society, Science and Technology (ESST) offers an MA degree in STS through study programs and student exchanges with over a dozen specializations.

== Professional associations ==
The field has professional associations in regions and countries around the world.

=== In Europe ===
- In Europe, the European Association for the Study of Science and Technology (EASST) was founded in 1981 to "improve scholarly communication and exchange in the field", "increase the visibility of the subject to policy-makers and to the general public", and "stimulate and support teaching on the subject at all levels". Similarly, the European Inter-University Association on Society, Science and Technology (ESST) researches and studies science and technology in society, in both historical and contemporary perspectives.
- In European nation states and language communities, a range of STS associations exist, including in the UK, Spain, Germany, Austria, Turkey. In some states, several formal associations exist.
  - For instance, in 2015, the UK-based Association for Studies in Innovation, Science and Technology (AsSIST-UK) was established, chaired by Andrew Webster (York) and Robin Williams (Edinburgh) principally to foster stronger integration between the innovation studies and STS fields. In 2021 it had a membership of 380. It holds annual conferences and has built strong links to policy practitioners in Westminster.
  - In Italy, STS Italia – The Italian Society for Social Studies of Science and Technology was founded in 2005. Its mission is "to build up an Italian network of researchers oriented to study Science and Technology starting from the social dynamics which characterize and interweave science and technology themselves".
  - In Sweden, the Swedish Network for Science and Technology Studies was founded in 2006, at the first national Swedish Conference for STS, STS Dagarna.
  - In Germany several STS associations exist, including the Gesellschaft für Wissenschafts- und Technikforschung, founded in 1987 or the stsing network, labelled "Doing Science and Technology Studies in and through Germany", founded 2020, an early career research network called INSIST and various STS-related sub-groups of the larger disciplinary associations (like sociology).

=== In Asia ===
- The Asia Pacific Science Technology & Society Network (APSTSN) primarily had members from Australasia, Southeast and East Asia and Oceania. APSTSN is not currently active.
- In Japan, the Japanese Society for Science and Technology Studies (JSSTS) was founded in 2001.
- The Australasian Science and Technology Studies Network (AusSTS) was founded in 2017 based at Deakin University. AusSTS now has several nodes in Australia and Aotearoa New Zealand and holds an annual workshop.
- In India, the Science and Technology Studies-India Network (STS-IN) was formed in December 2023. The Inaugural workshop was held on December 14 and 15, 2023, at Indian Institute of Technology Hyderabad.

=== In Latin America ===
- Estudios Sociales de la Ciencia y la Tecnología (ESOCITE) is the biggest association of Science and Technology studies. The study of STS (CyT in Spanish, CTS in Portuguese) here was shaped by authors like Amílcar Herrera and Jorge Sabato and Oscar Varsavsky in Argentina, José Leite Lopes in Brazil, Miguel Wionczek in Mexico, Francisco Sagasti in Peru, Máximo Halty Carrere in Uruguay and Marcel Roche in Venezuela.

=== In North America ===
- Founded in 1975, the Society for Social Studies of Science initially provided scholarly communication facilities, including a journal (Science, Technology, and Human Values) and annual meetings that were mainly attended by science studies scholars. The society has since grown into the most important professional association of science and technology studies scholars worldwide. The Society for Social Studies of Science members also include government and industry officials concerned with research and development as well as science and technology policy; scientists and engineers who wish to better understand the social embeddedness of their professional practice; and citizens concerned about the impact of science and technology in their lives.
- Founded in 1958, the Society for the History of Technology initially attracted members from the history profession who had interests in the contextual history of technology. After the "turn to technology" in the mid-1980s, the society's well-regarded journal (Technology and Culture) and its annual meetings began to attract considerable interest from non-historians with technology studies interests.
- Less identified with STS, but also of importance to many STS scholars, are the History of Science Society, the Philosophy of Science Association, and the American Association for the History of Medicine.
- Additionally, within the US there are significant STS-oriented special interest groups within major disciplinary associations, including the American Anthropological Association, the American Political Science Association, the National Women's Studies Association, and the American Sociological Association.

== Journals ==
Notable peer-reviewed journals in STS include:

- Social Studies of Science
- Science, Technology, & Human Values
- Science & Technology Studies (Journal)
- Engaging Science, Technology, and Society
- Catalyst: Feminism, Theory, Technoscience
- Technology in Society; Research Policy
- Isis - A Journal of the History of Science Society
- Minerva: A Journal of Science, Learning and Policy
- Science, Technology and Society
- Science as Culture
- Research Policy
- Revue d'Anthropologie des Connaissances
- IEEE Technology and Society Magazine
- IEEE Transactions on Technology and Society (IEEE-TTS)
- Technology and Culture
- Science and Public Policy
- Tapuya: Latin American Science, Technology and Society
- International Journal of Technoethics

Student journals in STS include:

- Intersect: the Stanford Journal of Science, Technology, and Society at Stanford
- DEMESCI: International Journal of Deliberative Mechanisms in Science
- The Science In Society Review: A Production of the Triple Helix at Cornell
- Synthesis: An Undergraduate Journal of the History of Science at Harvard

== Notable scholars ==
- Karen Barad
- S. Barry Barnes
- Wiebe Bijker
- David Bloor
- Barry Bozeman
- Richard Boyd
- Massimiano Bucchi
- Michel Callon
- Harry Collins
- Ruth Schwartz Cowan
- Andrew Feenberg
- Ulrike Felt
- Ludwik Fleck
- Steve Fuller
- Steven L. Goldman
- Matthias Gross
- Ian Hacking
- Donna Haraway
- Sandra Harding
- S. Lochlann Jain
- Sheila Jasanoff
- Emma Kowal
- Thomas Kuhn
- Bruno Latour
- John Law (sociologist)
- Donald Angus MacKenzie
- Carl May
- Annemarie Mol
- Elting E. Morison
- Michelle Murphy
- Alondra Nelson
- David F. Noble
- Shobita Parthasarathy
- Trevor Pinch
- Sara B. Pritchard
- Robert N. Proctor
- Sal Restivo
- Arie Rip
- Simon Schaffer
- Johan Schot
- Bernard Stiegler
- Lucy Suchman
- Helen Verran
- Judy Wajcman
- Robin Williams (academic)
- Langdon Winner
- Steve Woolgar

== See also ==
- Actor–network theory
- Anthropology of technology
- Assemblage (philosophy)
- Critique of technology
- Cultural lag
- Cyborg anthropology
- Engineering studies
- Historical materialism
- Innovation system
- Metascience
- Mode 2
- Normalization process theory
- Public awareness of science
- Science studies
- Science of team science
- Science and technology in Israel
- Science and technology studies in India
- Scientometrics
- Social shaping of technology
- Social construction of technology
- Sociology of scientific knowledge
- Sociotechnical system
- Technological innovation system
- Technology and society
- Trading zones (metaphor) – Metaphor applied to collaborations in science
