= Ulrike Felt =

Austrian social scientist (born 1957)

- Born: 1957 (age 68–69)

Academic background
- Education: PhD, Physics 1983
- Alma mater: University of Vienna

Academic work
- Discipline: Science and technology studies
- Institutions: CERN, University of Vienna
- Website: https://sts.univie.ac.at/en/about-us/ulrike-felt/

Ulrike Felt (born 1957) is an Austrian social scientist, active in the field of Science and Technology Studies. Currently, she holds the chair for Social Studies of Science and is Dean of the Faculty of Social Sciences at the University of Vienna. She also acted as the president of the European Association for the Study of Science and Technology (EASST). From 2002 to 2007, she has been editor-in-chief of the journal "Science, Technology, & Human Values".

== Life ==
Trained as a physicist, she acquired her PhD in Physics at the University of Vienna in 1983. From 1983 until 1988, she was part of a research team investigating the history of the European High Energy Physics Lab (CERN) in Genève. Subsequently, she was part of the Department for the Philosophy and Social Studies of Science at the University of Vienna, which had been newly founded under the lead of Helga Nowotny, becoming an assistant professor in 1989. Since 1999, she is full Professor of Social Studies of Science. From 2004 to 2014, she was Head of the newly founded Department of Science and Technology Studies. She has held guest professorships at the Université du Québec à Montréal, the Université Louis Pasteur, Strasbourg, the ETH Zurich and visiting scholar at the STS group at Harvard. She has been part of numerous international professional committees and held many scientific advisory posts, among them being a member of the expert advisory group "Science and Society" for the European Unions 6th Framework Program, and has been co-director of the EC DG Research expert group on "Science and Governance", from 2005 to 2007. She was the leading founder of the interdisciplinary Master program "Science - Technology - Society", which has been set up at the University of Vienna in 2009. She has been editor of the leading STS journal "Science, Technology, & Human Values" (SAGE) from 2002-2007 and has been the leading editor of the new Handbook of Science and Technology Studies (MIT Press, 2017). Since 2014 she is Dean of the Faculty of Social Sciences at the University of Vienna.

== Research ==
Ulrike Felt has published widely in different areas of Science, Technology, and Society. Throughout her work, questions of the public engagement with science and of science policy have been a major concern for Felt. Her work on public perception of different technologies, the organisation and reflection of different participatory events as well as on the complex relations of science and democracy has contributed in many innovative ways to the debates in STS and beyond.

An important line of her work has focused on changing modes of knowledge production within the sciences, and on how this impacts ways of working and living within research cultures. She has introduced the concept of "epistemic living spaces" in order to describe how the social and epistemic are co-produced within scientific work spaces:

"By epistemic living space, we mean researchers' individual or collective perceptions and narrative re-constructions of the structures, contexts, rationales, actors and values which mould, guide and delimit their potential actions, both in what they aim to know as well as in how they act in social contexts in science and beyond." (Felt/Fochler 2010: 4f)

Using this concept, she has pointed to the potential implications of recent changes within career structures and the organization of the sciences for the knowledge produced within contemporary societies, focusing recently on changing temporal orders of research practices and policy.

Another line of her work has focused on how science and technology are embedded within local and national contexts. By introducing the notion of "technopolitical cultures" (Felt et al. 2010), Felt has pointed to the nationally distinct ways of how technoscience is entangled with cultural norms and values. Further, she is interested in how novel technologies like nano or genetic testing become imagined and integrated within specific local contexts. These questions are closely tied to her methodological interests. Felt and the Department of Social Studies of Science have engaged not only in the development of novel qualitative social science methods, but also in reflecting the performativity and politics of both participatory engagements and traditional socio-scientific methods.

Recently, across her different research interests, she has been engaging with the role of changing temporal structures and the growing importance of future in shaping the interface of science, technology and society.

Finally, since late 2015 she is leading a new interfaculty research platform at the University of Vienna "Responsible Research and Innovation in Academic Practice".

== Key Publications ==
- Felt, Ulrike, Schumann, Simone, Schwarz, Claudia and Strassnig, Michael (2012) 'Technology of Imagination. A Card-based Public Engagement Method for Debating Emerging Technologies'. Qualitative Research, in press
- Felt, Ulrike, Igelsböck, Judith, Schikowitz, Andrea and Völker, Thomas (2012) 'Growing Into What? The (Un-)disciplined Socialisation of Early Stage Researchers in Transdisciplinary Research'. Higher Education, online first, DOI: 10.1007/s10734-012-9560-1
- Felt, Ulrike and Fochler, Maximilian (2012) 'Re-ordering Epistemic Living Spaces: On the Tacit Governance Effects of the Public Communication of Science', in Rödder, S., Franzen, M. and P. Weingart (eds), The Sciences' Media Connection – Communication to the Public and its Repercussions. Sociology of the Sciences Yearbook 28 (Dortrecht: Springer): 133-154.
- Felt, Ulrike and Müller, Ruth (2011) 'Tentative (Id)entities. On Technopolitical Cultures and the Experiencing of Genetic Testing', BioSocieties 6/3: 342-363.
- Felt, Ulrike and Fochler, Maximilian (2011) 'Slim futures and the fat pill. Civic imaginations of innovation and governance in an engagement setting', Science as Culture 20/3: 307-328.
- Felt, Ulrike and Fochler, Maximilian (2010) 'Machineries for Making Publics: Inscribing and Describing Publics in Public Engagement', Minerva 48/3, 219-238.
- Felt, Ulrike, Fochler, Maximilian and Winkler, Peter (2010) 'Coming to Terms with Biomedical Technologies in Different Technopolitical Cultures. A Comparative Analysis of Focus Groups on Organ Transplantation and Genetic Testing in Austria, France, and the Netherlands', Science, Technology, & Human Values, 35/4: 525-553.
- Felt, Ulrike (ed.) (2009): Knowing and Living in Academic Research. Convergence and Heterogeneity in Research Cultures in the European Context (Prague: Academy of Sciences of the Czech Republic).
- Felt, Ulrike, Gugglberger, Lisa and Mager, Astrid (2009) 'Shaping the Future E-Patient: The Citizen-Patient in Public Discourse on E-Health', Science Studies 22/1: 24-43.
- Felt, Ulrike, Bister, Milena, Strassnig, Michael and Wagner, Ursula (2009) 'Refusing the Information Paradigm: Informed Consent, Medical Research, and Patient Participation', health: An Interdisciplinary Journal for the Social Study of Health, Illness and Medicine 13/1: 87-106.
- Felt, Ulrike and Fochler, Maximilian (2008): The bottom-up meanings of the concept of public participation. Science and Public Policy 35/7, 489-499.
- Felt, Ulrike; Fochler, Maximilian; Mager, Astrid and Winkler, Peter (2008): Visions and Versions of Governing Biomedicine: Narratives on Power Structures, Decision-Making, and Public Participation in the Field of Biomedical Technologies in the Austrian Context. Social Studies of Science 38/2, 233-258.
- Felt, Ulrike; Wynne, Brian et al. (2007): Taking European Knowledge Society Seriously (Luxembourg: European Commission).
- Nowotny, Helga and Felt, Ulrike (1997) 'After the Breakthrough. The Emergence of High-Temperature Superconductivity as a Research Field' (Cambridge: Cambridge University Press).
- Felt, Ulrike, Nowotny, Helga and Taschwer, Klaus (1995) 'Wissenschaftsforschung. Eine Einführung' (Frankfurt am Main/New York: Campus).
- Felt, Ulrike (1993) 'Fabricating Scientific Success Stories', Public Understanding of Science 2/4: 375-90.
