= Science, Technology, & Human Values =

- Discipline: Science, technology and society; Sociology
- Language: English
- Edited by: Edward J. Hackett

Publication details
- History: 1967–present
- Publisher: SAGE Publications
- Frequency: Bimonthly
- Impact factor: 3.160 (2018)

Standard abbreviations
- ISO 4: Sci. Technol. Hum. Values

Indexing
- ISSN: 0162-2439
- LCCN: 82642469
- OCLC no.: 51204698

Links
- Journal homepage; Online access; Online archive

Science, Technology, & Human Values (ST&HV) is a peer-reviewed academic journal that provides a forum for research and debate in the field of science and technology studies (STS). From the "Newsletters of the Program on the Public Conceptions of Science" that Gerald Holton established in 1972, it became The Newsletter on Science, Technology, & Human Values, in 1976. ST&HV is published by the Society for Social Studies of Science, in conjunction with SAGE Publications. The journal is currently led by an editorial team based in Australia and New Zealand: Timothy Neale (Deakin University), Courtney Addison (Te Herenga Waka – Victoria University of Wellington), Matthew Kearnes (University of New South Wales), and Kari Lancaster (University of New South Wales).

== Former editors ==
The following people have served as editors-in-chief.

- Edward J. Hackett
- Susan Leigh Star
- Geoffrey C. Bowker
- Ulrike Felt
- Ellsworth R. Fuhrman
- Olga Amsterdamsa
- Susan E. Cozzens
- Marcel C. LaFollette
- Vivien B. Shelanski
- William A. Blanpied

== Abstracting and indexing ==
Science, Technology, & Human Values is abstracted and indexed in Scopus and the Social Sciences Citation Index. According to the Journal Citation Reports, its 2018 impact factor was 3.160, ranking it 4th out of 42 journals in the category "Social Issues".
