= Massimiano Bucchi =

Italian sociologist (born 1970)

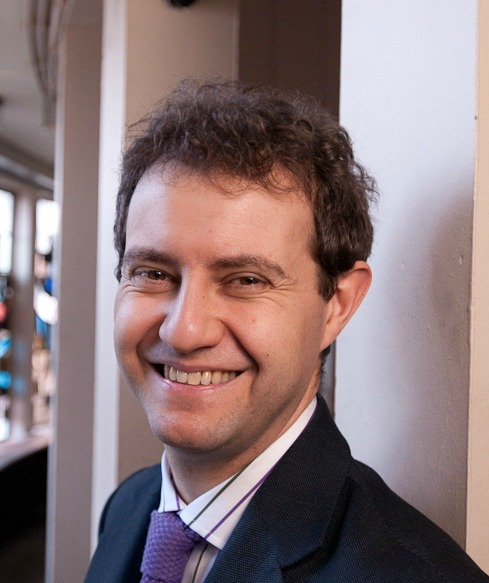
- Bucchi in 2016
- Born: 15 May 1970 (age 56)
- Occupation: Sociologist

Massimiano Bucchi (born Arezzo, 15 May 1970) is an Italian sociologist, writer, and professor of science and technology in society at the University of Trento (Italy). His works are in the area of science in society, science communication and the social implications of technologies and innovation.

== Biography ==
After graduating in Sociology from the University of Trento (Italy), he continued his studies in the United Kingdom at the University of Sussex and in the United States at the University of Wisconsin and the University of California Berkeley. He obtained his PhD in Political and Social Sciences from the European University Institute. He is Professor of "Science, Technology and Society" and of "Communication, Science and Technology" at the Department of Sociology and Social Research of the University of Trento, where he founded the international Master programme in Communication of Science and Innovation (SCICOMM). He has been a visiting professor at several universities in Asia, Europe, North America and Oceania, including ETH Zurich, University of Tokyo (Japan), and Otago University (New Zealand).

He is the author of papers in international journals such as Nature, Science, PLOS ONE, and several books published in more than twenty countries. Through articles published in the leading Italian newspapers and collaboration with television programmes (SuperQuark, RAI) he has contributed to popularizing social studies of science and technology.

From 2016 and 2019 he was the editor-in-chief of the international journal Public Understanding of Science published by Sage. In 2012 he organized in Florence, Italy, the XIIth world conference of Public Communication of Science and Technology (PCST).

In 2025, he was elected as a member of the Accademia Nazionale dei Lincei, one of the oldest scientific institutions in Europe.

He is one of the founders of the non-profit research centre Observa Science in Society, which has been monitoring trends in public perception and attitudes towards science and technology in Italy and in an international comparative perspective since 2003.

Among the main recognitions: RAI "G. Mencucci" Prize for research on mass communication (1996 and 2000); "N. Mullins" Prize of the Society for Social Studies of Science for the best junior essay in the sociology of science (1997)]; Lelli Prize for the best doctoral thesis in sociology (1998). Book awards: special jury Merck-Serono award for Beyond Technocracy (2007); Calabria prize for Scientisti e antiscientisti; Biblioteca La Vigna international prize for Newton's Chicken (2014).

== Works ==
- with Brian Trench, Science Communication. The Basics, Routledge, 2025, 160 pp.
- with Brian Trench (eds.), Handbook of Public Communication of Science and Technology, Routledge, 2021, 344 pp, 3rd edition expanded and updated.
- Newton’s chicken. Science in the Kitchen, World Scientific, 2020, pp. 168.
- with Brian Trench (eds.), The public communication of science, Routledge, New York, 2016.
- Beyond Technocracy. Citizens, Politics, Technoscience, New York: Springer, 2009 (pp. vii + 116).
- with Martin Bauer (eds.), Journalism, Science and Society: Science Communication Between News and Public Relations, New York: Routledge, 2007 (pp. 256).
- Science in Society. An introduction to social studies of science, London & New York: Routledge, 2004 (pp. 162). Hardcover and paperback edition.
- Science and the media. Alternative Routes in Scientific Communication, London and New York: Routledge, 1998 (pp. xii+195).
