= European Inter-University Association on Society, Science and Technology =

The European Inter-University Association on Society, Science and Technology (ESST) is an association of universities that teach and research together in the field of social, scientific and technological developments. Universities from all over Europe are members of the association, which was founded in 1991 and is registered as a non-profit organisation in Belgium. The association was founded to strengthen education and research in Science and Technology Studies (STS).

== Activities and ethos ==
ESST runs a programme of teaching and research devoted to science and technology studies, in both historical and contemporary perspectives. The ESST programme has affiliated faculty with strong interests in the intersections of science and technology with public policy, cultural change, and economic development.

The ESST programme is international in its outlook: it is a multicultural venture rooted in the teaching, research and scientific cultures of many European regions and countries, and in their wider social experience. The universities have developed a networked postgraduate programme focusing on the social, scientific and technological developments in Europe, which they teach in collaboration with each other. This involves substantial exchange of students and staff from the participating universities.

== ESST Master's degree ==
The ESST Association offers a Master's programme "Society, Science and Technology in Europe" and contributes to the development of information resources and analytical concepts and skills for researchers and students in the field of science, technological change and innovation. The programme is designed to provide postgraduate training for academics from all disciplines: Social Sciences, Natural Sciences, Engineering and Humanities.

=== Aim of the programme ===
The overall aim of the MA ESST is to provide future researchers, innovation consultants, research managers and policy makers with a deep and critical understanding of the relationship between research and innovation, their specific socio-historical contexts of emergence and contemporary socio-economic embeddedness. The programme takes an interdisciplinary approach and provides opportunities for student and staff exchange.

=== Educational structure ===
The ESST Master's programme is a 60 ECTS programme and is divided into two parts: a first general introduction part and a second specialisation part. The ESST programme is organised in different ways by the participating universities: Some universities offer ESST as a one-year programme with 60 ECTS: Athens, Maastricht and Madrid. Other partners have embedded the 60 ECTS ESST programme in a local two-year programme: Klagenfurt, Strasbourg and Trento. Oslo offers the ESST programme as a 90 ECTS programme lasting one and a half years. Regardless of whether the ESST MA is organised in one, one and a half or two years, all these universities offer a 60 ECTS ESST programme and thus fulfil the degree requirements.

All ESST universities offering the first semester teach a common curriculum (with some local additions) in that semester, after which students choose a specialisation from the range offered by the different universities within ESST in the second semester. Students have the option of either transferring between universities (and countries) after the first semester or staying at one university for both semesters. The Master's thesis is supervised by supervisors at the second-semester university and graded by staff from two ESST universities, one of whom is always from the first-semester university.

Other ESST partners only offer a specialisation in the second semester: Aalborg, Lisbon, Louvain, Lund, Tallinn and Toruń.

=== Language ===
Some universities offer the first 30 ECTS in English: Athens and Maastricht. Others offer the first 30 ECTS of the programme in their national language: Madrid, Klagenfurt, Oslo, Strasbourg and Trento.

=== Title and degree ===
Upon successful completion, students receive the Master of Arts (M.A.) "Society, Science and Technology", which confers the right to the corresponding title. At most ESST higher education institutions, students receive both a local Master's title and the ESST MA diploma. Students who successfully complete course modules covering the common ESST curriculum for the first semester, but who do not take (or complete) an ESST specialisation in the second semester and do not write a thesis in accordance with ESST rules, receive an ESST certificate in addition to their local degree.

== Master's programme universities ==
- Alpen-Adria-University of Klagenfurt, Austria
- Autonomous University of Madrid, Spain
- Maastricht University, The Netherlands
- NKUA, Athens, Greece
- University of Oslo, Norway
- University of Strasbourg, France
- University of Trento, Italy

== Second-semester specialisations ==
- Aalborg University, Denmark
- Lund University, Sweden
- Nicolaus Copernicus University, Poland
- University of Lisbon, Portugal
- Tallinn University of Technology, Estonia
- Université catholique de Louvain, Belgium
