= Research development =

Activities designed to aid the attraction of funding and relationships

Research development (RD) is a set of strategic, proactive, catalytic, and capacity-building activities designed to facilitate individual faculty members, teams of researchers, and central research administrations in attracting extramural research funding, creating relationships, and developing and implementing strategies that increase institutional competitiveness. These activities are typically practiced at universities, but are also in use at a variety of other research institutions.

Research development includes a diverse set of dynamic activities that vary by institution. These activities include initiating and nurturing partnerships, networks, and alliances between and among faculty at their institutions and funding agencies; and designing and implementing strategic services for their faculty and researcher constituents (such as workshops, trainings, program officer visits, proposal editing, PR communications, funding opportunity searches and dissemination, budget preparation, forms and submission assistance, research team building, and administering campus limited submission reviews).

Research development professionals initiate and nurture critical partnerships and alliances throughout the institutional research enterprise and between institutions and with their external stakeholders. With the goal of enabling competitive individual and team research and facilitating research excellence, research development professionals build and implement strategic services and collaborative resources that span across disciplinary and administrative barriers within their organizations and nothing beyond.

Research development differs significantly from university development (institutional fundraising or advancement) in that RD is not aimed at attracting contributions or donations. Rather, RD strengthens research programs and proposals to make them more competitive for extramural contracts and grants from governmental, private and non-profit funding agencies. Similarly, RD should not be confused with research and development (R&D) which refers to investments in (often) corporate scientific and technological research that leads to new products and applications.

Recent contractions in the availability of public and private research funding have intensified competition for fewer resources among universities. This trend has amplified the need for research development assistance and interventions at universities in order to enhance research excellence and competitiveness. These services have not traditionally been offered through university-sponsored research and projects offices that administer the submission of grant proposals and research funds management. In response to these challenges, research development is increasingly becoming a standard practice at universities, particularly research universities (defined, by the Carnegie Classification of Institutions of Higher Education, as universities that place a high priority on research and rely heavily on extramural funding).

According to the US-based National Organization of Research Development Professionals (NORDP), there are currently over 800 research development professionals employed at over 300 institutions (colleges/universities, teaching/not-for-profit hospitals, independent not-for-profit research organizations, national laboratories, research organizations wholly organized and administered by a college or university, consortia of colleges and universities, associations/societies with individual or institutional members predominantly from colleges and universities) across the United States and several foreign countries.

== Activities ==
Strategic Research Advancement

- Collaborate to identify areas of institutional research priorities
- Strategic Planning Support (information to leadership about opportunities/strengths/weaknesses)
- Advise VP/VC for Research on issues related to research
- Serve as VPs/VCs for Research representative to university community and external visitors
- Manage or contribute to decisions regarding internal funding
- Provide research areas development support to include such things as formal partnerships with external entities or facilitating faculty participation
- Interactions with political leaders related to research initiatives at your institution
- Industry collaboration and partnerships
- Liaison with funding agencies about direction of future research funding initiatives
- Bringing Program Managers to Campus or taking/introducing Faculty to Program Managers
- Assisting with Sponsor Site visits
- Coordinating/Managing the limited submission process

Research and Research Opportunities Communication

- Manage marketing of research, e.g. annual reports, research magazine, web page development/coordination, identifying institutional priorities
- Raise profile of university strengths that add to visibility or impact of university with external funding sources
- Providing proposal/award information related metrics to deans/chairs/faculty
- Website support e.g. grant opportunities and proposal development
- Collect and disseminate funding information to faculty and administrators
- Conducting Grant Writing Workshops on your campus or regionally

Collaboration/Team Science Enhancement

- Convene and coordinate multi-disciplinary interest groups
- Catalyze new cross-disciplinary research initiatives
- Sponsoring catalytic research events, e.g. research mini-symposia
- Develop and/or coordinate resources and tools to promote collaboration
- Provide guidance and expertise for building and fostering connections and teams
- Maintain faculty expertise database and other collaboration web tools
- Facilitating collaborations between investigators at your own institution
- Facilitating collaborations between investigators at other institutions
- Manage the institution's Research Networking Tool

Proposal Support Functions Assisting faculty to find funding opportunities

- Liaison with funding agencies during proposal development process
- Newsletters/Listserv announcements of funding opportunities
- Maintain a file of successful proposals
- Assisting faculty navigate through administrative structures within your institution
- Proposal Development Support for large, center-like awards
- Proposal Development Support for individual investigator awards
- Project Management (coordinating milestones, internal deadlines, meetings, e-mail reminders, etc.)
- Grant Writing & Editing: Technical/Scientific, Evaluation, Resources, Administrative, Timeline, Communications, Collaboration Planning, and Outreach sections of application
- Developing Budgets and budget justifications for application
- Handling Letters of Support/Biosketches/COI/Compliance/
- Developing Diversity Sections for Grant Proposals
- Developing RCR education Sections for Grant Proposals
- Coordinating/Finding Collaborating institutions for a proposal
- Suggesting collaborating scientists for a proposal
- Manage requests for cost sharing
- Coordinating pre-submission peer reviews of proposal drafts
- Manage "Red Team" reviewers or external review process
- Proposal Submission Support (copying, mailing, pdf generation, etc.)
- Coordinating Core Facility information
- Assist with Just in Time or additional information requests from sponsor after proposal submission
- Assist with post-award set-up of project to get it off the ground and/or communicate with collaborators post-award.
- Analyze proposal reviews and provide feedback to investigators or other institutional officials

== NORDP National Organization of Research Development Professionals ==
The National Organization of Research Development Professionals (NORDP) was established in 2010 as part of a grassroots movement to build a peer community of research development professionals. The organization grew from an informal network of over 100 individuals engaged in research development activities at universities and research institutions across the United States. The central goals of NORDP are to serve these professionals, by providing a formal organization to support their professional development, to enhance institutional research competitiveness, and to catalyze new research and institutional collaborations.

== See also ==
- Science of team science
