= Sara B. Pritchard =

American historian

- Born: 1972 (age 53–54)
- Occupations: Historian of technology, environmental historian

Academic background
- Education: University of Puget Sound (BA); Stanford University (MA, PhD)

Academic work
- Institutions: Cornell University College of Arts and Sciences

Sara B. Pritchard (born 1972) is an American historian of technology and environmental historian. She has written books on environmental technology and history. Pritchard is an associate professor of science and technology studies at Cornell University College of Arts and Sciences.

== Education ==
Pritchard earned a B.A. from University of Puget Sound. She completed a Ph.D. and M.A. from Stanford University.

== Career ==
Pritchard works on the history of technology, environmental history, and environmental technology, as well as environmental knowledge-making, environmental and technical expertise, and conservation science, politics, and history. She is an associate professor of Science and Technology Studies at Cornell University College of Arts and Sciences.

== Works ==
Pritchard's first book is Confluence: The Nature of Technology and the Remaking of the Rhône. With Dolly Jørgensen and Finn Arne Jørgensen, she co-edited the book New Natures: Joining Environmental History with Science and Technology Studies. Pritchard has also written, with Carl A. Zimring, Technology and the Environment in History. Pritchard is currently working on a book titled From Blue to Black Marble: Knowing Light Pollution in the Anthropocene. Her work for this project has been supported by a National Science Foundation grant and Cornell University's Society for the Humanities. Pritchard delivered the 2017 Melville-Nelles-Hoffmann Lecture in Environmental History at York University. In 2013, she gave a Rutgers Center for Historical Analysis Tuesday Morning Seminar Series talk at Rutgers University. Pritchard and her work have also been featured in The Boston Globe, The Atlantic, "Technology's Storytellers" from the Society for the History of Technology, and the podcast Flash Forward. In Fall 2020, she co-edited a special volume of Minding Nature on "Climate Change, Coronavirus, and Environmental Justice: A Collection of Undergraduate Creative Projects." Her most recent work addresses the history, legacy, and ethics of light-pollution.

== Awards ==
In 2005, Pritchard won the Joel A. Tarr Envirotech Article Prize.
