= Barry Bozeman =

Professor of technology policy and public management

Barry Bozeman is a professor emeritus at Arizona State University where he was founding Director, Center for Organization Research and Design, Regents' Professor and Arizona Centennial Professor of Technology Policy and Public Management. He specializes in two disparate fields, organization theory and science and technology policy.

== Early life and education ==
Bozeman was born in Birmingham, Alabama on January 18, 1947 to Glenn Bozeman and Audrey J. Bozeman (née Martin). His mother was a full-time homemaker and this father a construction worker. His early life was characterized by much family relocation, resulting in his attending 21 different schools before the 7th grade. In 1960, the family settled down in West Palm Beach, Florida and Bozeman graduated from Palm Beach High School in 1964. He attended Palm Beach High Junior College, in Lake Worth, Florida, (now Palm Beach State College), graduating in 1966. Bozeman played on the varsity baseball team at Palm Beach Junior College where he had the distinction of scoring the first run in the new team's history.

In 1970, Bozeman entered the doctoral program in political science at Ohio State University, focusing on public policy studies. He graduated in 1973.

== Career ==
In 1973, Bozeman began as an Assistant Professor of Political Science at Georgia Institute of Technology. During that period, he began specializing in Science and Technology Policy and in 1974, as part of the Intergovernmental Personnel Act, took a position as an analyst in the National Science Foundation's Division of Information Science and Technology. After returning briefly to Georgia Tech, Bozeman took a job at the University of Missouri-Columbia, where he was appointed in the Department of Political Science, as well as the new Department of Public Administration.

In 1977, Bozeman began a long stay (1977-1993) at Syracuse University’s Maxwell School of Citizenship and Public Affairs. While at Syracuse, Bozeman was the Director of the Doctoral Program (1979-1986) and was the founding director of the Center for Technology and Information Policy. He was graduate advisor for Michael M. Crow.

He moved in 1993 to be the first full-time director of the new School of Public Policy at Georgia Tech and was later appointed as Regent's Professor, the first social scientist to become a Regent's Professor at Georgia Tech. Bozeman also co-founded the Research Value Mapping (RVP) Program in the School of Public Policy.

In 2006, Bozeman moved to University of Georgia where he became the first holder of the Department of Public Administration and Policy's Ander Crenshaw Chair in Public Policy.

In 2013, Bozeman moved to Arizona State University as Arizona Centennial Professor of Technology Policy and Public Management and Director of the Center for Organization Research and Design.

Bozeman has served as an advisor and consulate to several state and federal agencies in the United States including the Department of commerce and Department of energy and worked briefly at Japan's Science and Technology Agency’s

== Scholarly contributions ==
Bozeman's chief contributions to organization theory and public administration include:

- The theory of “dimensional publicness,” showing all organizations are affected by the constraints and endowment of political authority and of market authority and that behavior can be predicted from the mix of these forces.
- The normative “public value theory,” set as an alternative to market failure theory and suggesting that public values can be attained by a variety of institutions, public and private, acting separately or together.
- Theory and empirical research on organizational red tape and bureaucratic pathologies.

Bozeman's chief contributions to science and technology policy include:

- Research and theory on technology transfer, suggesting that a wide variety of outcome measures should be embraced (“contingent theory of effectiveness”) rather than solely short-term market impacts.
- Research and theory on scientific collaboration, both at the level of the individual researcher and the scientific organization or research center.

== Honors and awards ==
- Distinguished Visiting Professor of Tsinghua University (2018)
- NASPAA/ASPA Distinguished Researcher Award (2014)
- George Fredrickson Award, Public Management Research Association (2013), for lifetime of intellectual contributions to the field of public management, 2013
- Herbert Simon Award, American Political Science Association (2013), best book on public administration topic, 2007-2012 (Public Values and Public Interest, Georgetown University Press 2007)
- Fellow, American Association for the Advancement of Science, elected 2005
- Fellow, National Academy of Public Administration, elected 2006.
- Charles Levine Award, National Association for Schools of Public Affairs and Administration and American Society for Public Administration, career award for research, teaching and professional service (national award recognizing one academic scholar each year), 2000
- Fulbright Fellowships, University of Copenhagen, 1989–90, Valencia Polytechnic and INGENIO, 2012

== Personal life ==
Barry Bozeman and his wife Monica Gaughan live in Tempe, Arizona. Dr. Gaughan, a sociologist, is a faculty member at Arizona State University. Bozeman has three children.

== Selected publications ==
=== Books ===
- Barry Bozeman and Craig Boardman, Research Collaboration and Team Science: A State-of-the-Art Review and Agenda (Springer Publishing, 2014).
- Barry Bozeman and Mary Feeney, Rules and Red Tape Research: A Prism for Understanding Theory Development in Public Administration (Sharpe Publishing, 2011).
- Barry Bozeman, Public Values and Public Interest: Counterbalancing Economic Individualism (Georgetown University Press, 2007). [Awarded Herbert Simon Award of the American Political Science Association, best book in Public Administration during period 2007-2012].
- Barry Bozeman, Bureaucracy and Red Tape (Englewood Cliffs, N.J.:Prentice-Hall, 2000).
- Michael Crow and Barry Bozeman, Limited by Design: R&D Laboratories in the United States (New York: Columbia University Press, 1998) ISBN 0-231-10982-2
- Barry Bozeman, All Organizations are Public: Bridging Public and Private Organization Theory (San Francisco: Jossey-Bass Publishing, 1987).

=== Articles ===
This list only contains articles from 2000 onward.

- Bozeman, B. (2025). "Impervious Corruption: President Trump and the Deformation of Democracy." Public Administration Review. 85 (6). 1582–1597. doi.org:10.1111/puar.70027
- Bozeman, B.; Rimes, H.; Youtie, J. (February 2015). "The evolving state-of-the-art in technology transfer research: Revisiting the contingent effectiveness model". Research Policy. 44 (1): 34–49. doi:10.1016/j.respol.2014.06.008.
- Bozeman, B (2013). "What organization theorists and public policy researchers can learn from one another: Publicness theory as a case-in-point". Organization Studies. 34 (2): 169–188. doi:10.1177/0170840612473549. S2CID 145522214.
- Bozeman, B.; Boardman, C. (2013). "Academic faculty in university research centers: Neither capitalism's slaves nor teaching fugitives". The Journal of Higher Education. 84 (1): 88–120. doi:10.1353/jhe.2013.0003. S2CID 143931655.
- Bozeman, Barry; Fay, Daniel; Slade, Catherine P. (2012-11-28). "Research collaboration in universities and academic entrepreneurship: the-state-of-the-art". The Journal of Technology Transfer. 38 (1): 1–67. doi:10.1007/s10961-012-9281-8. ISSN 0892-9912. S2CID 154328161.
- Bozeman, B (2012). "Multidimensional red tape: A theory coda". International Public Management Journal. 15 (3): 245–265. doi:10.1080/10967494.2012.725283. S2CID 153553061.
- Bozeman, Barry; Moulton, Stephanie (2011-07-01). "Integrative Publicness: A Framework for Public Management Strategy and Performance". Journal of Public Administration Research and Theory. 21 (suppl 3): i363–i380. doi:10.1093/jopart/mur031. ISSN 1053-1858.
- Bozeman, Barry; Slade, Catherine P.; Hirsch, Paul (2011-07-05). "Inequity in the distribution of science and technology outcomes: a conceptual model". Policy Sciences. 44 (3): 231–248. doi:10.1007/s11077-011-9132-8. ISSN 0032-2687. S2CID 11725148.
- Bozeman, Barry (2010-11-25). "Toward a Theory of Organizational Implosion". The American Review of Public Administration. 41 (2): 119–140. doi:10.1177/0275074010381781. ISSN 0275-0740. S2CID 154181116.
- Bozeman, Barry; Gaughan, Monica (2011-01-01). "Job Satisfaction among University Faculty: Individual, Work, and Institutional Determinants". The Journal of Higher Education. 82 (2): 154–186. doi:10.1353/jhe.2011.0011. ISSN 1538-4640. S2CID 144888551.
- Bozeman, B.; Gaughan, M. (2011). "How do men and women differ in research collaborations? An analysis of the collaborative motives and strategies of academic researchers". Research Policy. 40 (10): 1393–1402. doi:10.1016/j.respol.2011.07.002.
- Bozeman, Barry; Feeney, Mary K. (2007-10-01). "Toward a Useful Theory of Mentoring A Conceptual Analysis and Critique". Administration & Society. 39 (6): 719–739. doi:10.1177/0095399707304119. ISSN 0095-3997. S2CID 143989012.
- Jørgensen, Torben Beck; Bozeman, Barry (2007-05-01). "Public Values An Inventory". Administration & Society. 39 (3): 354–381. doi:10.1177/0095399707300703. ISSN 0095-3997. S2CID 144783291.
- Bozeman, B.; Gaughan, M. (2007). "Impacts of Grants and Contracts on Academic Researchers' Interactions with Industry". Research Policy. 36 (5): 694–707. doi:10.1016/j.respol.2007.01.007.
- Lee, Sooho; Bozeman, Barry (2005-10-01). "The Impact of Research Collaboration on Scientific Productivity". Social Studies of Science. 35 (5): 673–702. CiteSeerX 10.1.1.113.4619. doi:10.1177/0306312705052359. ISSN 0306-3127. S2CID 145308230.
- Bozeman, Barry; Corley, Elizabeth (2004-05-01). "Scientists' collaboration strategies: implications for scientific and technical human capital". Research Policy. Scientific and Technical Human Capital: Science Careers and Networks as Knowledge Assets. 33 (4): 599–616. doi:10.1016/j.respol.2004.01.008.
- Bozeman, Barry (2002-03-01). "Public-Value Failure: When Efficient Markets May Not Do". Public Administration Review. 62 (2): 145–161. CiteSeerX 10.1.1.199.1692. doi:10.1111/0033-3352.00165. JSTOR 3109898.
- Bozeman, Barry; Dietz, James; Gaughan, Monica (2001). "Models of Scientific Careers: Using Network Theory to Explain Transmission of Scientific and Technical Human Capital". International Journal of Technology Management. 22 (7/8): 716–740. doi:10.1504/IJTM.2001.002988.
- Rainey, Hal G.; Bozeman, Barry (2000-04-01). "Comparing Public and Private Organizations: Empirical Research and the Power of the A Priori". Journal of Public Administration Research and Theory. 10 (2): 447–470. doi:10.1093/oxfordjournals.jpart.a024276. ISSN 1053-1858.
- Bozeman, Barry (2000-04-01). "Technology transfer and public policy: a review of research and theory". Research Policy. 29 (4–5): 627–655. doi:10.1016/S0048-7333(99)00093-1.
