= Public Understanding of Science =

Bimonthly academic journal on science

- Discipline: Public awareness of science
- Language: English
- Edited by: Hans-Peter Peters (Research Center Jülich & Free University of Berlin, Germany)

Publication details
- History: 1992–present
- Publisher: SAGE Publications
- Frequency: Bi-monthly
- Impact factor: 2.754 (2-year), 3.100 (5-year) (2019)

Standard abbreviations
- ISO 4: Public Underst. Sci.

Indexing
- CODEN: PUNSEM
- ISSN: 0963-6625 (print); 1361-6609 (web)
- LCCN: 92658626
- OCLC no.: 36297216

Links
- Journal homepage; Online access; Online archive

Public Understanding of Science is a bimonthly peer-reviewed academic journal established in 1992 and published by SAGE Publications. It covers topics in the popular perception of science, the role of science in society, philosophy of science, science education, and science in public policy. The editor-in-chief is Hans-Peter Peters (Research Center Jülich & Free University of Berlin, Germany).

== Abstracting and indexing ==
Public Understanding of Science is abstracted and indexed in Scopus and the Social Sciences Citation Index. According to the Journal Citation Reports, its 2019 2-year impact factor is 2.754, ranking it 13 out of 88 journals in the category "Communication" and 2 out of 46 journals in the category "History & Philosophy of Science".

== Criticism ==
Public Understanding of Science has been criticised for its lack of commitment to open access, given that it publishes research about public understanding and access to scientific knowledge. Journal editors have published reasons for their position in the journal. However debate continues even within the journal's editorial team.

== Editors ==
John Durant, 1992-1997
Bruce V. Lewenstein, 1998-2003
Edna F. Einsiedel, 2004-2009
Martin W. Bauer, 2010-2015
Massimiano Bucchi, 2016-2019
Hans-Peter Peters, 2020–present
