= Harry Collins =

British sociologist of science (born 1943)

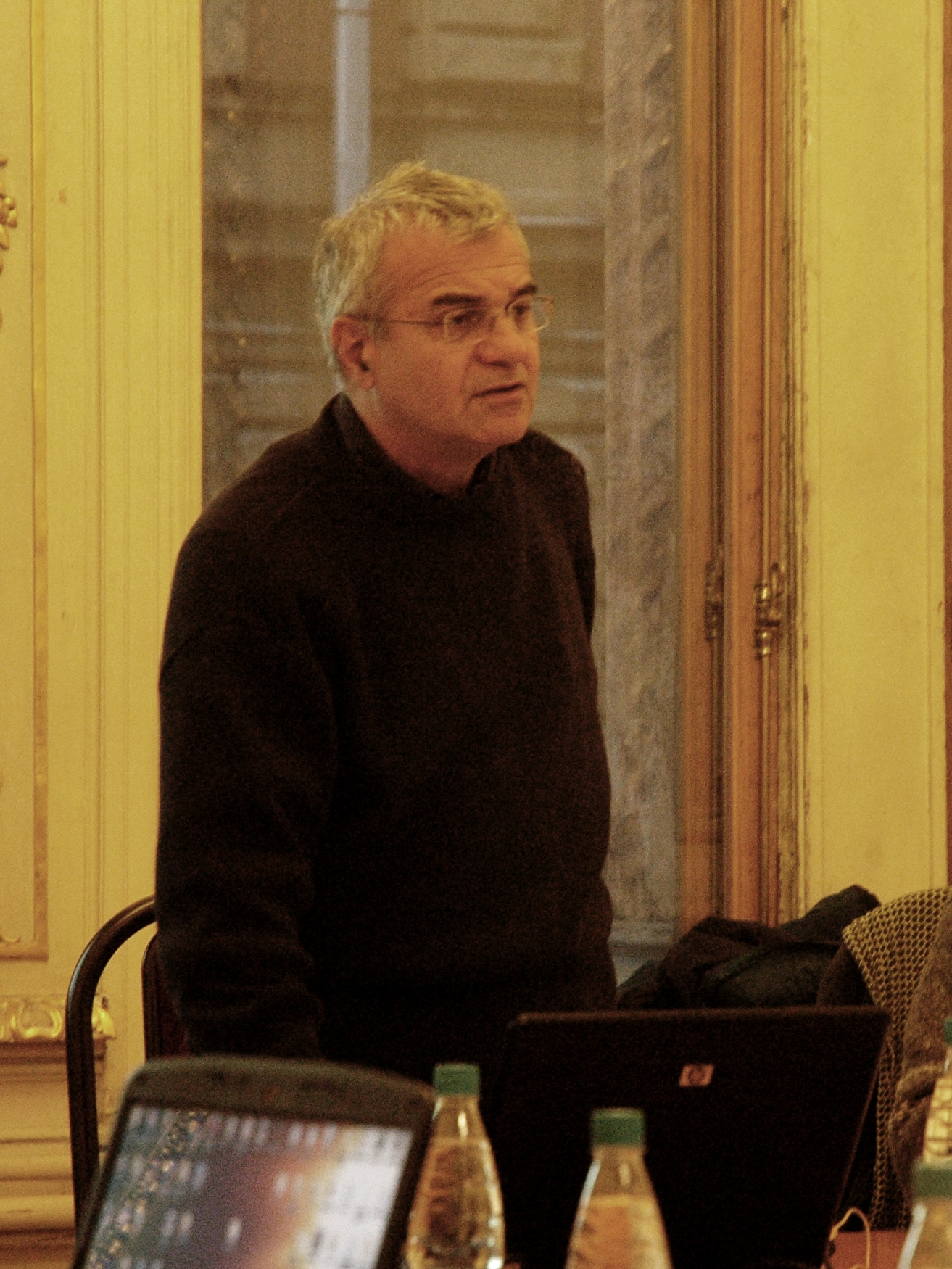
- Collins at a STS workshop in 2010
- Born: 13 June 1943 (age 83); United Kingdom
- Occupation: Sociologist
- Known for: Bath School, Sociology of Scientific Knowledge (SSK)

Harry Collins, FBA FLSW (born 13 June 1943), is a British sociologist of science at the School of Social Sciences, Cardiff University, Wales. In 2012 he was elected a Fellow of the British Academy. In 2013, he was elected a Fellow of the Learned Society of Wales.

== Career ==
While at the University of Bath Professor Collins developed the Bath School approach to the sociology of scientific knowledge.

In Changing Order: Replication and Induction in Scientific Practice, Collins outlines a general theory of sociology of science. Drawing from the concepts of "Language Game" and "Forms of Life", derived from the philosopher Ludwig Wittgenstein, he seeks an explanation for how scientists follow rules and patterns when performing experiments and scientific practice. Collins' perspective is usually called a relativist position, although this is a strong oversimplification.

Collins has written for over 30 years on the sociology of gravitational wave physics. His publications in this area include: "The Seven Sexes: Study in Sociology of a Phenomenon, or Replication of Experiments in Physics" "Son of Seven Sexes: The Social Destruction of a Physical Phenomenon". He has traced the search for gravitational waves, and has shown how scientific data can be subject to interpretative flexibility, and how social or 'non-scientific' means can be sometimes used to close scientific controversies.

At the beginning of the 2000s, Collins along with Robert Evans, also of Cardiff University, has published works on what they term the "Third Wave of Science Studies" and, in particular, the idea of interactional expertise. This aims to address questions of legitimacy and extension and public involvement in scientific decision-making. They continue to research and publish on this topic.

== Selected works ==
=== Books ===
- Collins, Harry M. (1985). Changing Order: Replication and Induction in Scientific Practice. London Beverly Hills: Sage Publications. ISBN 9780803997172.
- Collins, Harry M. (1990). Artificial Experts: Social Knowledge and Intelligent Machines. Cambridge, Massachusetts: MIT Press. ISBN 9780262531153.
  - Explains the nature and limits of intelligent machines, especially expert systems.
- Collins, Harry M.; Pinch, Trevor (1998) [1993]. The Golem: What You Should Know about Science (2nd ed.). Cambridge, UK; New York, NY: Cambridge University Press. ISBN 9781107604650.
- Collins, Harry M.; Kusch, Martin (1998). The Shape of Actions What Humans and Machines Can Do. Cambridge, Massachusetts: MIT Press. ISBN 9780262032575.
- Collins, Harry M. (2004). Gravity's Shadow the Search for Gravitational Waves. Chicago: University of Chicago Press. ISBN 9780226113784.
- Collins, Harry M.; Pinch, Trevor (2005). Dr. Golem: How to Think about Medicine. Chicago: University of Chicago Press. ISBN 9780226113692.
- Collins, Harry M.; Evans, Robert (2007). Rethinking Expertise. Chicago: University of Chicago Press. ISBN 9780226113623.
- Collins, Harry M. (2010). Tacit and Explicit Knowledge. Chicago: University of Chicago Press. ISBN 9780226113807.
- Collins, Harry M. (2011). Gravity's Ghost: Scientific Discovery in the Twenty-First Century. Chicago: The University of Chicago Press. ISBN 9780226113562.
- Collins, Harry M. (2013). Gravity's Ghost and Big Dog: Scientific Discovery in the Twenty-First Century. Chicago: The University of Chicago Press. ISBN 9780226052298.
  - Big Dog, Collins' next book on LIGO, was published as part of the paperback edition of Gravity's Ghost (2011), with a combined title.
- Collins, Harry M.; Pinch, Trevor (2014) [1998]. The Golem at Large: What You Should Know about Technology (6th ed.). Cambridge: Cambridge University Press. ISBN 9781107688285.
- Collins, Harry M. (2014). Are We All Scientific Experts Now?. Cambridge, UK; Malden, Massachusetts: Polity. ISBN 9780745682044.
- Collins, Harry M.; Evans, Robert; Higgins, Christopher (2016). Bad Call: Technology's Attack on Referees and Umpires and How to Fix It. Cambridge, MA: MIT Press. ISBN 9780262035392.
- Collins, Harry M. (2017). Gravity's Kiss: The Detection of Gravitational Waves. Cambridge, MA: MIT Press. ISBN 9780262036184.
- Collins, Harry M.; Evans, Robert (2017). Why Democracies Need Science. Cambridge, UK; Malden, Massachusetts: Polity. ISBN 9781509509614.
- Collins, Harry M. (2018). Artifictional Intelligence: Against Humanity's Surrender to Computers. Cambridge, UK; Malden, Massachusetts: Polity. ISBN 9781509504121.
- Collins, Harry M. (2019). Forms of Life: The Method and Meaning of Sociology. London: MIT Press. ISBN 9780262536646.

=== Chapters in books ===
- Collins, Harry M.; Yearley, Steven (1992), "Epistemological chicken", in Pickering, Andrew (ed.), Science as practice and culture, Chicago: University of Chicago Press, pp. 301–326, ISBN 9780226668017.

=== Journal articles ===
- Collins, Harry M. (May 1975). "The seven sexes: a study in the sociology of a phenomenon, or the replication of experiments in physics". Sociology. 9 (2): 205–224. doi:10.1177/003803857500900202. S2CID 121517709.
- Collins, Harry M.; Evans, Robert (April 2002). "The third wave of science studies: studies of expertise and experience". Social Studies of Science. 32 (2): 235–296. doi:10.1177/0306312702032002003. S2CID 145135881.
