= Steven L. Goldman =

American academic (born 1941)

Steven Louis Goldman (born 1941) is the Andrew W. Mellon Distinguished Professor in the Humanities at Lehigh University.

== Biography ==
Goldman studied as an undergraduate at Polytechnic University of New York, earning a Bachelor of Science degree in Physics. He then attended Boston University, where he received Master of Arts and PhD degrees in Philosophy. In the 1970s, Goldman was on faculty in the philosophy department at the State College campus of Pennsylvania State University. At Pennsylvania State, he was involved in the development of one of the first U.S. academic programs in science, technology, and society studies (STS).

In 1977, Goldman joined the faculty at Lehigh University, as Andrew W. Mellon Distinguished Professor in the Humanities. He has a joint appointment in the departments of philosophy and history because his teaching and research focus on the history, philosophy, and social relations of modern science and technology. Professor Goldman came to Lehigh from the philosophy department at the State College campus of Pennsylvania State University, where he was a co-founder of one of the first U.S. academic programs in science, technology, and society (STS) studies. For 11 years (1977–1988), he served as director of Lehigh’s STS program and was a co-founder of the National Association of Science, Technology and Society Studies. Professor Goldman has received the Lindback Distinguished Teaching Award from Lehigh University and a Book-of-the-Year Award for a book he coauthored (another book was a finalist and translated into 10 languages). He has been a national lecturer for Sigma Xi—the scientific research society—and a national program consultant for the National Endowment for the Humanities. He has served as a board member or as editor/advisory editor for a number of professional organizations and journals and was a co-founder of Lehigh University Press and, for many years, co-editor of its Research in Technology Studies series. Goldman retired from Lehigh University in 2016, but is still associated with the Department of Philosophy as a Professor Emeritus.

Since the early 1960s, Professor Goldman has studied the historical development of the conceptual framework of modern science in relation to its Western cultural context, tracing its emergence from medieval and Renaissance approaches to the study of nature through its transformation in the 20th century.

He has published numerous scholarly articles on his social-historical approach to medieval and Renaissance nature philosophy and to modern science from the 17th to the 20th centuries and has lectured on these subjects at conferences and universities across the United States, in Europe, and in Asia. In the late 1970s, the professor began a similar social-historical study of technology and technological innovation since the Industrial Revolution. In the 1980s, he published a series of articles on innovation as a socially driven process and on the role played in that process by the knowledge created by scientists and engineers. These articles led to participation in science and technology policy initiatives of the federal government, which in turn led to extensive research and numerous article and book publications through the 1990s on emerging synergies that were transforming relationships among knowledge, innovation, and global commerce.

Goldman is the author of the following courses for The Teaching Company:

- Science in the Twentieth Century: A Social Intellectual Survey (2004)
- Science Wars: What Scientists Know and How They Know It (2006)
- Great Scientific Ideas That Changed the World (2007)
