= Matthias Gross =

German sociologist

Matthias Gross (German spelling: Groß, pronounced [gro:s], audio; born 1969) is a German sociologist and science studies scholar. He currently is Full Professor of Environmental Sociology at the University of Jena, and by joint appointment, at Helmholtz Centre for Environmental Research – UFZ in Leipzig, Germany.

Gross received a PhD in sociology from Bielefeld University in 2001. Between 2002 and 2005 he co-directed the research group “Real World Experiments” at the Institute of Science and Technology Studies at Bielefeld University and from 2005 to 2013 he was senior research scientist at the Helmholtz Centre in Leipzig. He held research positions and visiting professorships at the University of Wisconsin, Madison, Loyola University Chicago, and the Martin Luther University of Halle, Germany. He is co-editor of the interdisciplinary journal Nature + Culture. Between 2006 and 2018 he was chair of the German Sociological Association's Section on Environmental sociology and from 2011 to 2019 he was chair of the European Sociological Association's Research Network on Environment and Society. In 2013 he has won the Sage Prize for Innovation and Excellence from the British Sociological Association for his paper on Georg Simmel and nonknowledge and in 2018 the Frederick H. Buttel Prize of the International Sociological Association (ISA)

== Selected books ==
- Telesiene, Audrone; Matthias Gross; Markus Hadler, eds. (2026): Green European Revisited: Environmental Behaviour and Attitudes in Europe in the Face of the Polycrisis. London: Palgrave Macmillan. ISBN 978-3-032-18359-0.
- Gross, Matthias; McGoey, Linsey, eds. (2023): Routledge International Handbook of Ignorance Studies. Fundamentally revised 2nd Edition. London: Routledge. ISBN 978-0-367-60814-9.
- Davidson, Debra J.; Gross, Matthias, eds. (2018). The Oxford Handbook of Energy and Society. Oxford: Oxford University Press. ISBN 978-0-190-63385-1.
- Telesiene, Audrone; Gross, Matthias, eds. (2017). Green European: Environmental Behaviour and Attitudes in Europe in a Historical and Cross-Cultural Comparative Perspective. London: Routledge. ISBN 978-1-138-12395-3.
- Gross, Matthias; McGoey, Linsey, eds. (2015). Routledge International Handbook of Ignorance Studies. London: Routledge. ISBN 978-0-415-71896-7.
- Matthias Gross; Rüdiger Mautz (2015). Renewable Energies. London: Routledge (Key Ideas Series). ISBN 978-0-415-85861-8.
- Matthias Gross (2010). Ignorance and Surprise: Science, Society, and Ecological Design. Cambridge, MA: MIT Press (Inside Technology Series). ISBN 978-0-26201-348-2.
- Gross, Matthias; Heinrichs, Harald, eds. (2010). Environmental Sociology: European Perspectives and Interdisciplinary Challenges. Dordrecht: Springer. ISBN 978-9-04818-729-4.
- Matthias Gross (2003). Inventing Nature: Ecological Restoration by Public Experiments. Lanham, MD: Rowman & Littlefield (Lexington Books). ISBN 978-0-73910-504-7.
