= Science of team science =

Field of scientific philosophy and methodology

Science of Team Science (SciTS) is a methodological field that focuses on understanding and improving cross-disciplinary collaboration in research. The field encompasses conceptual and methodological approaches for examining how teams of scientific researchers can be organised to work more effectively. SciTS initiatives involve identifying and managing factors that influence collaborative research and evaluating its outcomes.

== History ==
Since the 1990s, interest and large-scale funding for team-based research initiatives have increased, driven by efforts to tackle complex problems through cross-disciplinary collaboration. Some argue that this trend reflects the growing recognition that addressing multifaceted challenges, such as climate change and public health issues, benefits from partnerships among scientists and practitioners from diverse fields. One SciTS literature review identified team science as an important component of interprofessional collaborative research. The report, published by the University of Minnesota's National Center for Interprofessional Practice and Education, called for the integration of team science into health professions education and clinical practice.

The development of SciTS was partly driven by concerns raised by funding agencies, which sought to assess the performance of team science, understand its added value, evaluate the return on investment in large research initiatives, and inform science policy. The term 'science of team science' was formally introduced and popularized in October 2006 at a conference titled The Science of Team Science: Assessing the Value of Transdisciplinary Research, hosted by the National Cancer Institute in Bethesda, Maryland. The SciTS field was further developed and discussed in a supplement to the American Journal of Preventive Medicine published in July 2008. The First Annual International Science of Team Science (SciTS) Conference was held on April 22–24, 2010, in Chicago, Illinois, organised by the Northwestern University Clinical and Translational Sciences (NUCATS) Institute.

In 2013, the National Academy of Sciences established a National Research Council Committee on the Science of Team Science to evaluate the current state of knowledge and practice in SciTS. A committee report was published in 2015.

In 2023, Patrick Forscher and colleagues published a review identifying the benefits of big team science, noting that innovations facilitate the collection of larger samples and support efforts toward reproducibility and generalisability. However, concerns exist that team science could increasingly influence funding priorities, potentially shifting emphasis from applied science to more theoretical research areas, as well as leading to unsuccessful large-scale projects. Forscher's recommendations included creating an advisory board and structured by-laws, formalising feedback mechanisms from contributors, engaging in mentoring, and separating idea generation from project implementation.

In 2026, the discourse shifted towards the management of Big Team Science (BTS). Vaidis and colleagues synthesised work from global collaborations such as the Psychological Science Accelerator, ManyBabies, ManyManys and ManyPrimates. Although BTS can challenge statistical power and cross-cultural generalizability, several bureaucratic challenges arise requiring non-traditional management to function as a high-fidelity organisational structure from informal collaborative agreements, forward and backward translation and the value of Universal Time (UTC) for global synchronisation and decision-making protocols to maintain ethical and epistemological integrity in teams that exceed hundreds of members and labs to address the key questions in science.

== Methods ==
The definition of a successful team may vary depending on stakeholders. SciTS uses both qualitative and quantitative methods to evaluate the antecedent conditions, collaborative processes, and outcomes associated with team science. It also considers the organizational, social, and political context that influences team science.

A 2018 review of literature on SciTS published between 2006 and 2016 identified 109 articles. It reported that 75% of these articles used pre-existing data (e.g., archival data), 62% used bibliometrics, over 40% used surveys, and over 10% used interview and observational data.

== See also ==
- Integrative learning
- Interactional expertise
- Interdisciplinarity
- Multidisciplinary
- Multidimensional network
- Transdisciplinary
- Global brain
