= Rimburg =

- Village
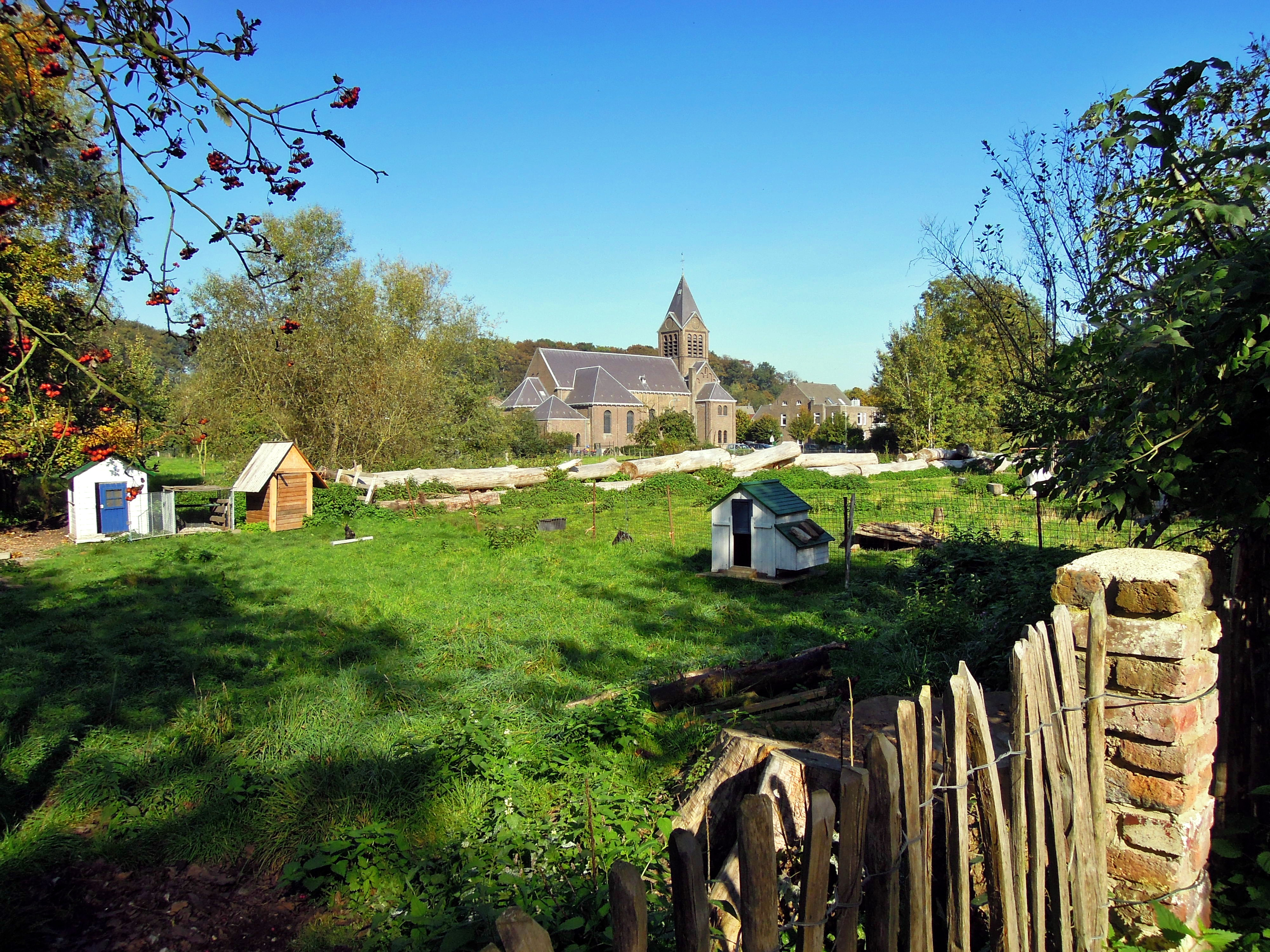
- View on the church of Rimburg

- Location in the Netherlands Location in the province of Limburg in the Netherlands
- Coordinates: 50°55′1″N 6°5′12″E
- Country: Netherlands
- Province: Limburg
- Municipality: Landgraaf

Area
  - Total: 1.50 km^{2} (0.58 sq mi)
- Elevation: 139 m (456 ft)

Population (2021)
  - Total: 660
  - Density: 440/km^{2} (1,100/sq mi)
- Time zone: UTC+1 (CET)
  - Summer (DST): UTC+2 (CEST)
- Postal code: 6374
- Dialing code: 045

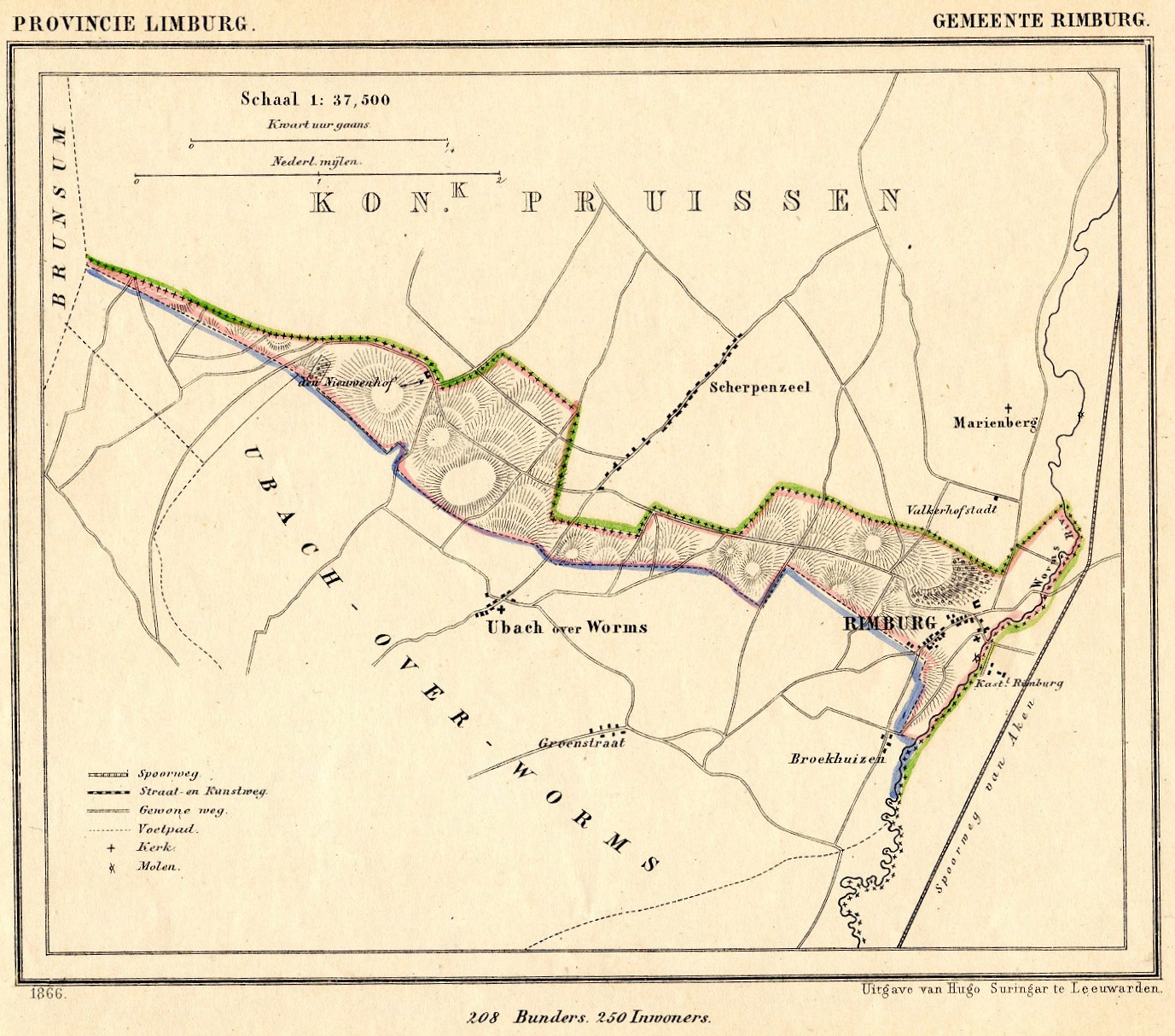
The former municipality of Rimburg in 1866

Rimburg (Dutch pronunciation: [ˈrɪmbʏr(ə)x]) is a village in the Dutch province of Limburg. It is located in the municipality of Landgraaf, on the German border.

Rimburg was a separate municipality until 1887, when it was merged with Ubach over Worms.

Rimburg is a village (consisting of the cores and Rimburg Broekhuizen) on the River Worm in eastern South Limburg. Rimburg is part of the municipality of Landgraaf. It is part of the former municipality Ubach over Worms. In the early 1980s the municipalities of Schaesberg, Ubach over Worms and Nieuwenhagen were collectively known as the SUN municipalities, until they merged to form the new municipality of Landgraaf.

== History ==
Until 1886 Rimburg was an independent municipality; its territory extended to Brunssum.

The glory, with aldermen, was after the arrival of the French at the end of the 18th century, as well Ubach over Worms, assigned to the Canton Rolduc. When the cantonal division was disbanded in 1800, the municipality Rimburg was formed from that part of the former glory, located on the left / west bank of the river Worm. The remaining part of the former glory became German territory. The municipality Rimburg had during its existence the same government organization as Nieuwenhagen, which therefore is referred to.

The municipality was terminated by "Law of the 16th December 1886 to union of municipalities Rimburg and Ubach over Worms." The effective date for termination was designated the day the board of the new municipality Ubach over Worms had its first meeting. That first meeting was held on March 15, 1887.

The last council meeting of the municipality Rimburg took place on October 9, 1886.

=== World War II ===
Rimburg became an independent municipality once again during World War II.

Rimburg was in the frontline and was the last part of South Limburg liberated on 2 October 1944. It played an important role in the encirclement of Aachen. During this assault the castle was heavily defended by the Germans. One part of the castle was destroyed along with many treasures.

On the German side of the Worm, there still are many bunkers that were once part of the Siegfried Line.

== Geography ==
The river Worm (called Wurm in Germany) flows past Rimburg and forms the natural markings of the Dutch-German state border. Across the Worm, on the territory of the German municipality Übach-Palenberg, is the castle of Rimburg, which is still in aristocratic hands.

== Sights ==
Sights in Rimburg include the castle, the water tower, a water mill on the bank of the Worm near the church, the church itself, and several historic farms.

On the street "Broekhuizenstraat", the foot of a Roman milestone can be found.

== Gallery ==
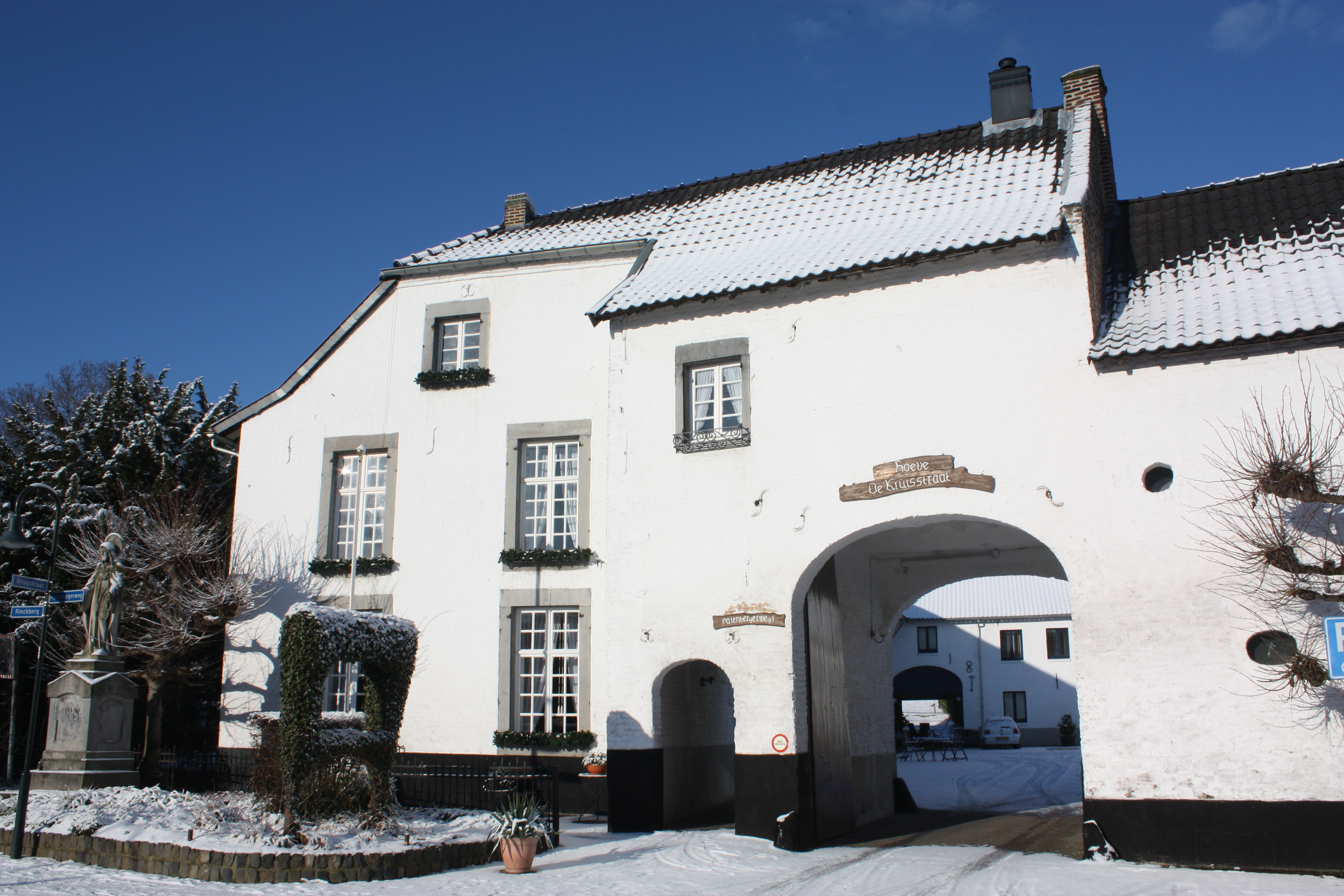
Farm in Rimburg

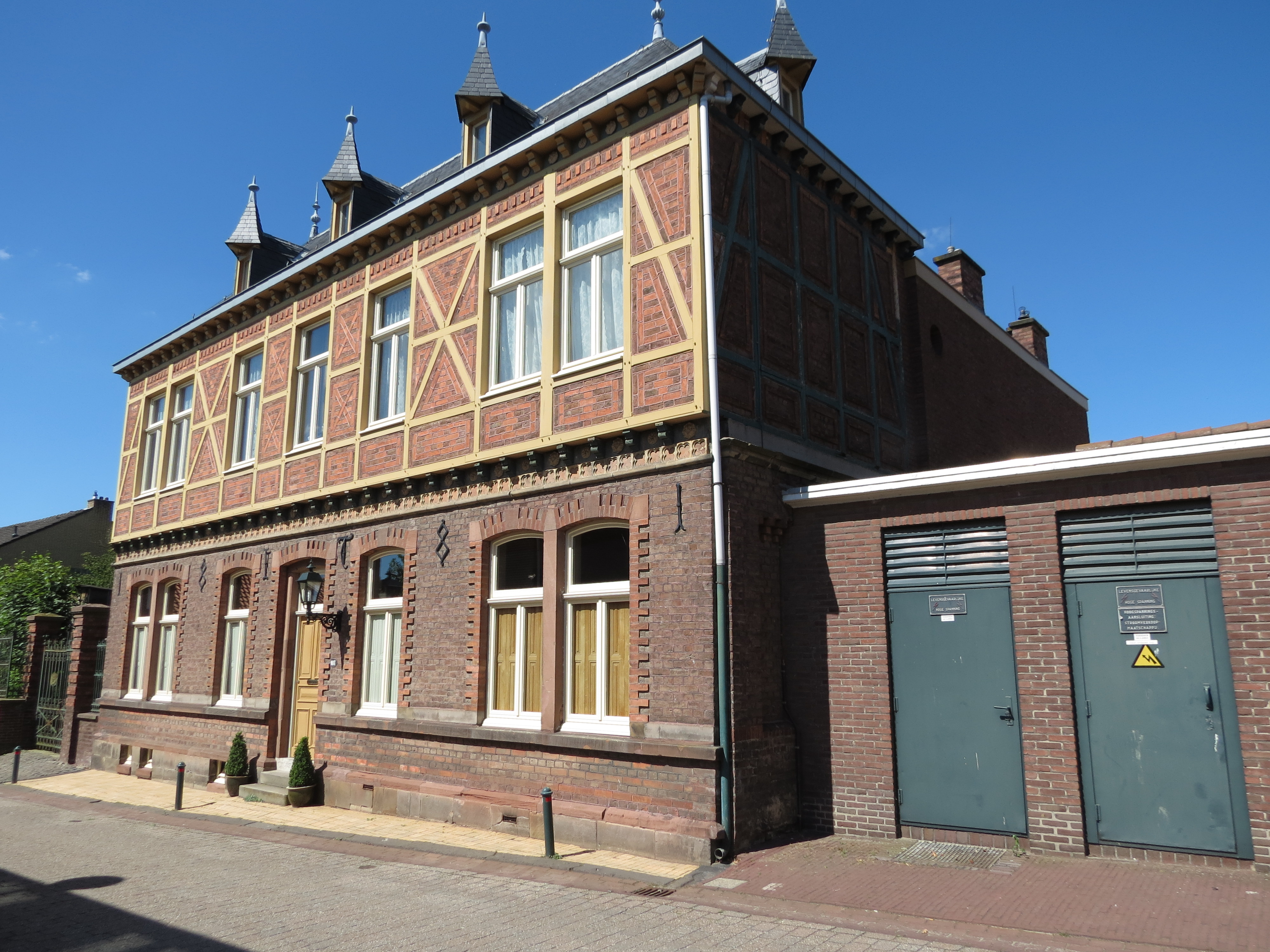
House in Rimburg

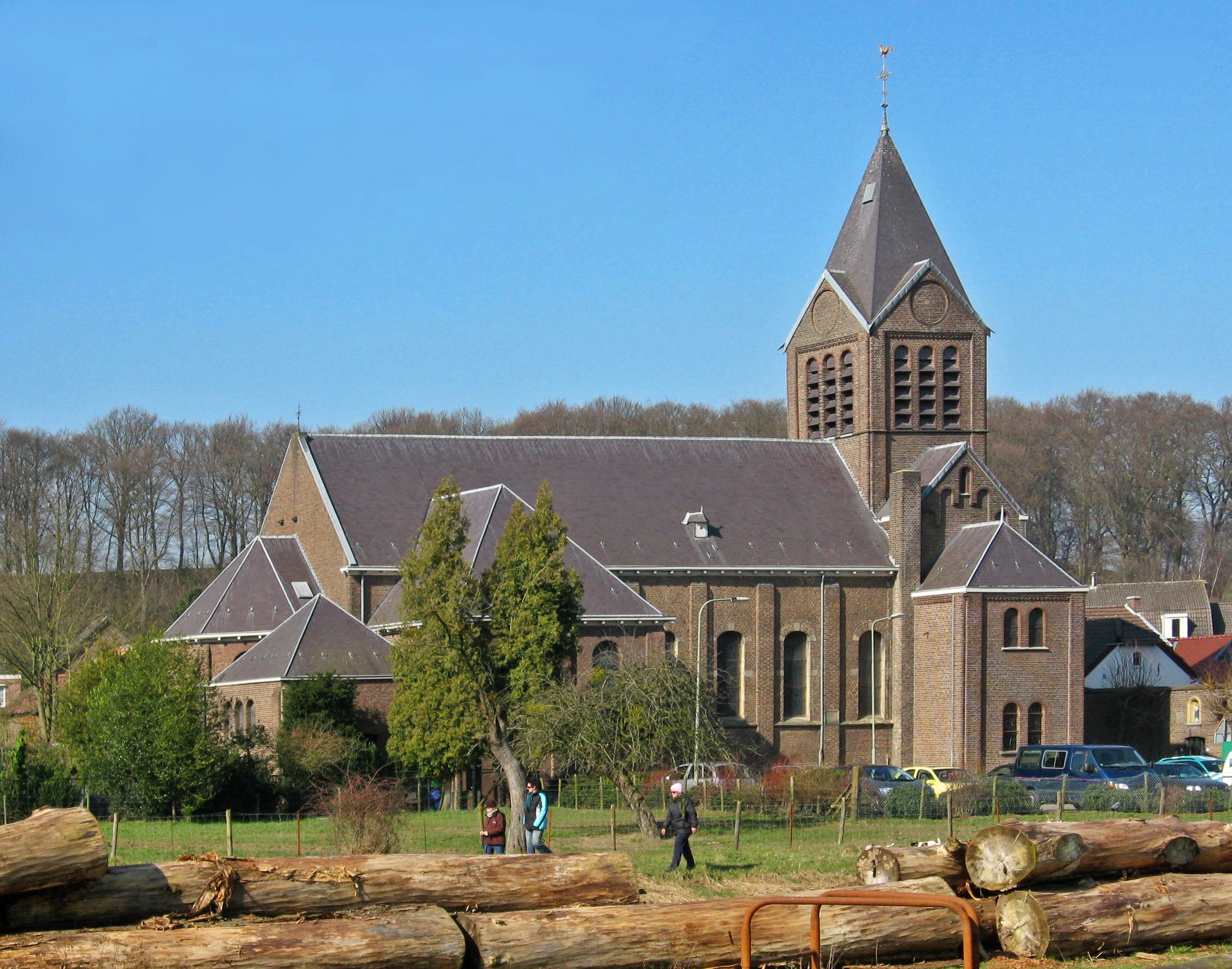
Church of Rimburg

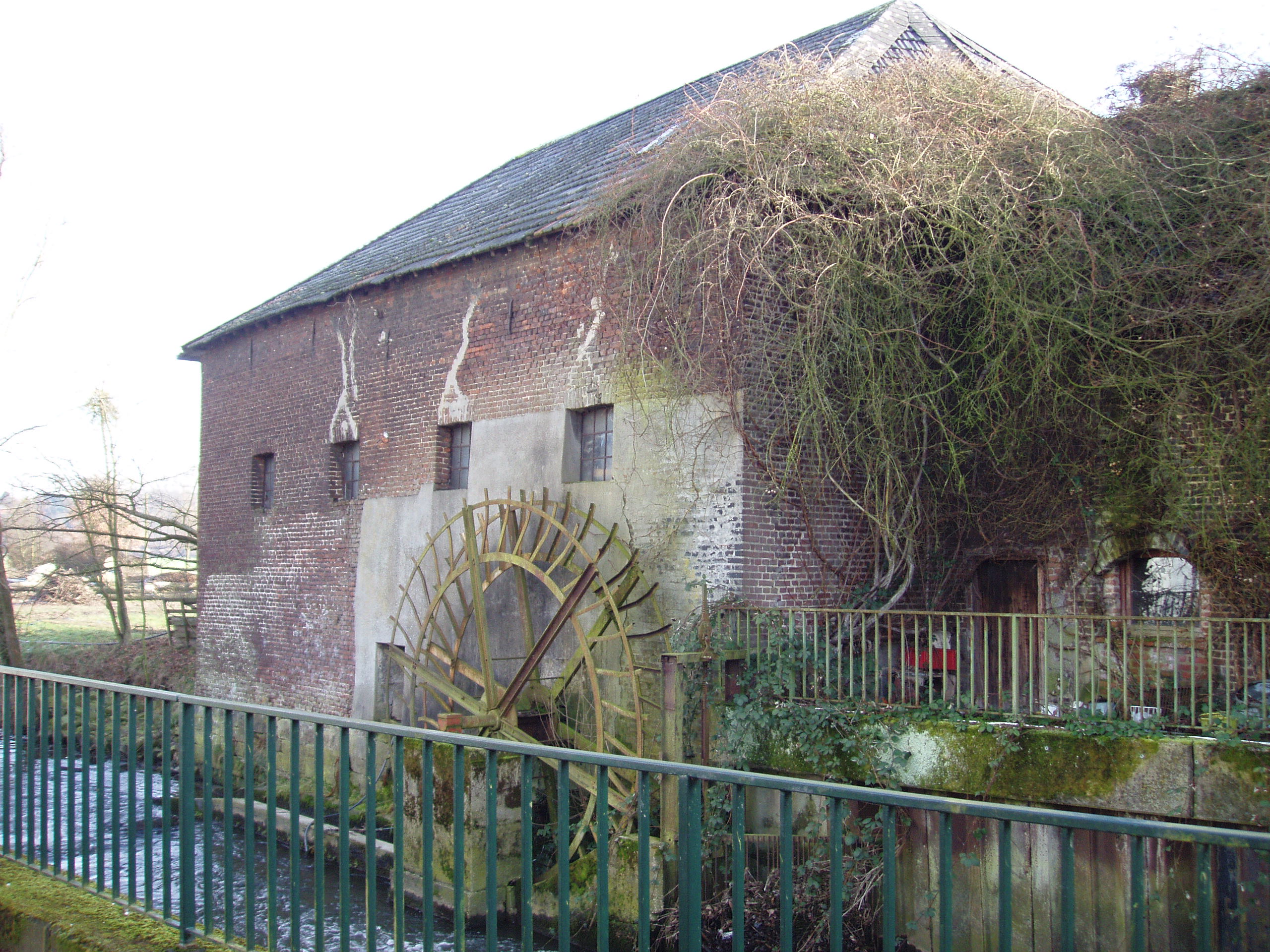
Water mill
