= List of mayors of Landgraaf =

This is a list of mayors of Landgraaf, Netherlands.

In 1982 the municipality of Landgraaf was created by the fusion of the municipalities of Nieuwenhagen, Schaesberg and Ubach over Worms.

Mayors of Dutch municipalities are appointed by the cabinet in the name of the monarch, with advice of the city council.

== Mayors of Landgraaf ==
Period	Name of Mayor	Party	Notes
1982 - 1993	Hans Coenders	CDA	
1993 - 1 October 2010	L.H.F.M. (Bert) Janssen	PvdA	
1 October 2010 – 24 May 2021	Raymond Vlecken	CDA	
25 May 2021 – present	Jan (J.J.) Schrijen	unaffiliated	acting
