= Ludwik Fleck Prize =

The Ludwik Fleck Prize
- Awarded for: Published book in science and technology studies
- Presented by: Society for the Social Studies of Science
- First award: 1992
- Website: Official website

The Ludwik Fleck Prize is an annual award given for a book in the field of science and technology studies. It was created by the 4S Council (Society for the Social Studies of Science) in 1992 and is named after microbiologist Ludwik Fleck.

The prize is named after the Polish microbiologist and sociologist Ludwik Fleck (1896-1961), author of Genèse et développement d'un fait scientifique (1935), which influenced Thomas Samuel Kuhn's conception of the history of science, constructivist epistemology, and various fields of research such as the sociology of science, the sociology of scientific knowledge, science studies and the social construction of technologies.

== Prize Winners ==
Year	Recipient	Awarded work
1994	Donald A. MacKenzie	Inventing Accuracy: A Historical Sociology of Nuclear Missile Guidance
1995	Londa Schiebinger	Nature's Body: Gender in the Making of Modern Science
1996	Steven Shapin	A Social History of Truth: Civility and Science in 17th Century England
1997	Theodore M. Porter	Trust in Numbers: The Pursuit of Objectivity in Science and Public Life
1998	Peter Dear	Discipline and Experience: The Mathematical Way in the Scientific Revolution
1999	Donna J. Haraway	Modest_Witness@Second_Millennium.FemaleMan©Meets_OncoMouse™: Feminism and Technoscience (published 1996)
2000	Adele Clarke	Disciplining Reproduction: Modernity, American Life Sciences, and 'the Problems of Sex'
2001	Karin Knorr-Cetina	Epistemic Cultures: How the Sciences Make Knowledge
2002	Lily E. Kay	Who Wrote the Book of Life? A History of the Genetic Code
2002	Randall Collins	The Sociology of Philosophies: A Global Theory of Intellectual Change
2003	Helen Verran	Science and an African Logic
2004	Annemarie Mol	The Body Multiple
2005	Peter Keating and Alberto Cambrosio	Biomedical Platforms
2006	Philip Mirowski	The Effortless Economy of Science?
2007	Geoffrey Bowker	Memory Practices in the Sciences
2008	Michelle Murphy	Sick Building Syndrome and the Problem of Uncertainty
2009	Steven Epstein	Inclusion: Politics of Difference in Medical Research
2010	Warwick Anderson	The Collectors of Lost Souls. Turning Kuru Scientists into Whitemen
2011	Marion Fourcade	Economists and Societies: Discipline and Profession in the United States, Britain and France, 1890s to 1990s
2012	Hugh Raffles	Insectopedia
2013	Isabelle Stengers	Cosmopolitics
2014	Helen Tilley	Africa as a Living Laboratory: Empire, Development, and the Problem of Scientific Knowledge, 1870-1950
2015	S. Lochlann Jain	Malignant: How Cancer Becomes Us
2016	Banu Subramaniam	Ghost Stories for Darwin
2017	Judy Wajcman	Pressed for Time: The Acceleration of Life in Digital Capitalism
2018	Lundy Braun	Breathing Race into the Machine: The Surprising Career of the Spirometer from Plantation to Genetics (published 2014).
2019	Michelle Murphy	The Economization of Life
2020	Noémi Tousignant	Edges of Exposure: Toxicology and the Problem of Capacity in Postcolonial Senegal
2021	Thom van Dooren	The Wake of Crows: Living and Dying in Shared Worlds
2022	Aniket Aga	Genetically Modified Democracy
2023	Donovan Schaefer	Wild Experiment: Feeling Science and Secularism after Darwin
2024	Shannon Cramm	Unmaking the Bomb: Environmental Clean up and the Politics of Impossibility
2025	Lisa Yin Han	Deepwater Alchemy: Extractive Mediation and the Taming of the Seafloor
2026	Jen Rose Smith	Ice Geographies: The Colonial Politics of Race and Indigeneity in the Arctic

== See also ==
- List of social sciences awards
