= Eating In Theory =

2021 book by Annemarie Mol

- Authors: Annemarie Mol
- Language: English
- Subjects: Anthropology
- Publisher: Duke University Press
- Publication date: 2021
- Publication place: United States
- Media type: Print
- Pages: 208
- ISBN: 978-1-4780-1037-1

Eating in Theory is a 2021 book by the anthropologist Annemarie Mol, published by Duke University Press. In a review published by Leonardo, Hannah Drayson contextualised Eating in Theory as "one of a number of recent publications that make use of the insights offered by attention to metabolism".

== Description ==
Writing in Theory, Culture, & Society, Robert Beauregard suggested that Mol's approach in the book "is to question the presumptions on which others have based their investigations". Through the book, Beauregard sees Mol reconsidering "how we understand the four philosophical quandaries of being, knowing, doing, and relating" through "theorizing from the persepctive of the body rather than of the mind". Through the book, Mol critically engages with the work of Hannah Arendt, René Descartes, Maurice Merleau-Ponty and Michel Serres.

== Reception ==
Emre Keser, in a review for Social Anthropology, described Eating in Theory as "a delicious book", saying "I devoured it as if I was eating after having starved for a long time". Keser praised the book's "serene and humble writing". Keser summarised the book as "a fine contribution to anthropology and philosophy as well as food studies, science and technology studies, and environmental studies".

Ema Noëlla Kibirkstis, reviewing the book in Digest, wrote that Mol's focus on human metabolic interactions with the world "allows for a different, and perhaps more accurate, understanding of human experiences of eating." Kibirkstis commented that she wished that Mol would have expanded on "the contentious subject of food and risk". Kibirkstis wrote that the book was "reminiscient of Sarah Pink's work on sensory ethnography" and concluded that "Mol teaches us to view the world through eating, relating it to larger issues of overconsumption and ecological sustainability".

Michael A. Johnson, in a review for Food, Culture & Society, framed Eating in Theory as a continuation of Mol's earlier work in The Body Multiple to address "how various knowledge practices, from medicine to dietetics, construe the body as an object of knowledge". Johnson described the book as "an enjoyable and thought-provoking read" and said that it "is essential reading for anyone concerned with the ethics of eating in the Anthropocene era".
