= Banu Subramaniam =

Professor

Banumathi Subramaniam
- Born: India
- Education: University of Madras, Duke University
- Awards: Michelle Kendrick Prize (2020), Ludwik Fleck Prize (2016), Outstanding Academic Title (2015)
- Scientific career
- Fields: Plant biology, feminist science studies
- Workplaces: University of Massachusetts, Amherst
- Doctoral advisor: Mark D. Rausher

External videos
- “Life (Un) Ltd: Banu Subramaniam”, UCLA Center for the Study of Women

Banu Subramaniam is a professor of women, gender and sexuality studies at Wellesley College. Originally trained as a plant evolutionary biologist, she writes about social and cultural aspects of science as they relate to experimental biology. She advocates for activist science that creates knowledge about the natural world while being aware of its embeddedness in society and culture. She co-edited Making Threats: Biofears and Environmental Anxieties (2005) and Feminist Science Studies: A New Generation (2001). Her book Ghost Stories for Darwin: The Science of Variation and the Politics of Diversity (2014) was chosen as a Choice Outstanding Academic Title in 2015 and won the Society for Social Studies of Science Ludwik Fleck Prize for science and technology studies in 2016. Her most recent book, Holy Science: The Biopolitics of Hindu Nationalism (2019), won the Michelle Kendrick Prize for the best book from the Society for Literature, Science, and the Arts in 2020.

== Early life and education ==
Subramaniam grew up in India and received a baccalaureate degree from Stella Maris College at the University of Madras. She then attended Duke University, where she studied evolutionary plant biology, receiving a Ph.D. in evolutionary genetics. Her Ph.D. thesis was Maintenance of the Flower Color Polymorphism at the W Locus in the Common Morning Glory, Ipomoea purpurea (1994). While completing her Ph.D., she also earned a graduate certificate in women's studies.

== Career ==
Subramaniam has held academic appointments at Harvard University, Northeastern University, the University of Arizona, the University of California, Irvine, and the University of North Carolina at Chapel Hill, where she directed the Women in Science program. In 1995, she was awarded a National Science Foundation grant for a faculty-student action project for graduate women in science and mathematics. In 2000, she received a National Science Foundation grant to study soil communities and their effects on invasive plant species. In 2001, she joined the department of women's studies at the University of Massachusetts, Amherst as an assistant professor. While at the University of Massachusetts, she was named a Distinguished Faculty Lecturer and awarded the Chancellor's Medal, which is the highest faculty honor for service to the university.

She has co-edited the books Making Threats: Biofears and Environmental Anxieties (2005) and Feminist Science Studies: A New Generation (2001). Her book Ghost Stories for Darwin: The Science of Variation and the Politics of Diversity (2014) is a "radically interdisciplinary feminist treatment" that examines the experimental practices of science through the histories of eugenics and genetics, and the ways in which historical ideas have informed our thinking about difference. Ghost Stories for Darwin explores the ghosts of racism and sexism that work to place limitations on who can be a knower, how one can come to know, and what can be known. She writes at the intersection of the social and the scientific to question how we understand variation and diversity, and her work encourages disruption of binary disciplinary thinking. Her most recent book is Holy Science: The Biopolitics of Hindu Nationalism (2019), which explores the interactions of religious nationalism and science in India. Holy Science includes case studies that consider the interconnections of science and religion, how they are shaped by their social contexts and structures of power, and how their aims can converge. Her current work in feminist science studies is focused on decolonizing botany by looking at post-colonial studies and biology.

== Awards ==
Subramaniam received the 2016 Society for Social Studies of Science Ludwik Fleck Prize for science and technology studies for Ghost Stories for Darwin: The Science of Variation and the Politics of Diversity (2014). Ghost Stories for Darwin was also selected by Choice as an Outstanding Academic Title in 2015. Holy Science: The Biopolitics of Hindu Nationalism (2019) was awarded the Michelle Kendrick Prize for the best book from the Society for Literature, Science, and the Arts in 2020.
