= Marcia Cruz-Correa =

Puerto Rican physician-scientist and gastroenterologist (born 1969)

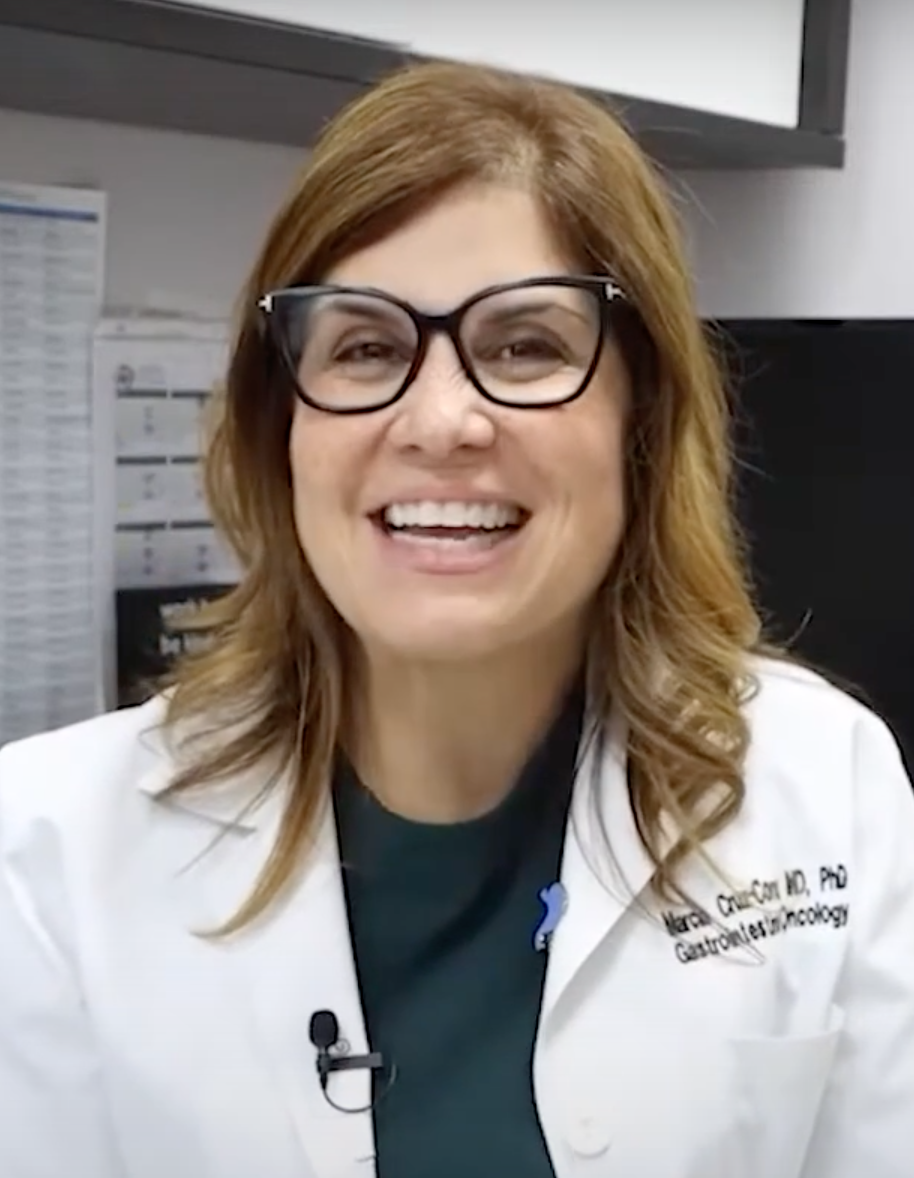
- Cruz-Correa in 2023
- Born: March 14, 1969 (age 57); California, U.S.
- Education: University of Puerto Rico (BS); University of Puerto Rico School of Medicine (MD); Johns Hopkins University
- Scientific career
- Fields: Gastrointestinal oncology
- Workplaces: Johns Hopkins University; University of Puerto Rico
- Doctoral advisor: Neil R. Powe

Marcia Roxana Cruz-Correa (born March 14, 1969) is a Puerto Rican physician-scientist and gastroenterologist known for her work in gastrointestinal oncology, focusing on the genetics and prevention of gastrointestinal cancers. She is a professor at the University of Puerto Rico School of Medicine and former executive director of the UPR Comprehensive Cancer Center.

== Early life and education ==
Cruz-Correa was born in California on March 14, 1969. She attended the University of Puerto Rico (UPR), earning a B.S. in general science, graduating magna cum laude in 1990. While studying at the University of Puerto Rico she also worked as a hotel concierge. In 1995, she completed her M.D. with honors at University of Puerto Rico School of Medicine. Following medical school, Cruz-Correa completed an internship and residency in internal medicine at the same institution from 1995 to 1998.

Her advanced training in gastroenterology took place at Johns Hopkins Hospital, where she completed a fellowship in gastroenterology and hepatology from 1998 to 2001. During this period, she also pursued a Ph.D. in clinical research and genetic epidemiology, graduating from the Johns Hopkins Bloomberg School of Public Health in 2003. Her dissertation was titled, Risk Factors for Loss of Genomic Imprinting of Insulin Growth Factor II Gene in Normal Colonic Tissue and Blood. Neil R. Powe was her doctoral advisor.

== Career ==
In 2001, Cruz-Correa joined the faculty at Johns Hopkins University as an assistant professor in the department of gastroenterology. Simultaneously, she held positions at other medical institutions, including an associate staff role at the Cleveland Clinic Florida. She was also a major in the United States Army Reserve, working in the division of gastroenterology at the Madigan Army Medical Center located on Joint Base Lewis-McChord. By 2003, her research primarily focused on gastrointestinal diseases, including Crohn’s disease, Barrett’s esophagus, and familial adenomatous polyposis. Over the years, Cruz-Correa has published peer-reviewed studies on topics like gastrointestinal graft-versus-host disease, cancer risk in Peutz–Jeghers syndrome, and the adoption of ablation therapy in Barrett's esophagus.

Cruz-Correa joined the University of Puerto Rico (UPR) as an associate professor of medicine and biochemistry. Her research has centered on gastrointestinal cancers, particularly the genetic and environmental factors contributing to cancer risk. She has explored strategies for cancer prevention, including the use of endoscopic techniques for cancer screening and early intervention. Cruz-Correa led the establishment of the first population-based familial colorectal cancer registry in Puerto Rico, improving the understanding the genetic and environmental factors contributing to cancer in the Puerto Rican population. In clinical practice, Cruz-Correa was a medical staff member at the VA Caribbean Health Care System, where she contributes her expertise in treating veterans. By 2011, she was a lieutenant colonel in the U.S. Army Reserve.

Cruz-Correa was the Basic and Translational Scientific Director at the UPR Comprehensive Cancer Center until she was appointed as the executive director in 2020, making her the first woman to serve in this role. Alongside this position, she has continued to lead the center's Gastrointestinal Oncology Research Program. Her research has been supported by continuous funding from the National Institutes of Health (NIH) for nearly two decades, including studies funded by the National Cancer Institute (NCI).

Cruz-Correa's research encompasses early-phase clinical trials, genetic epidemiology, and preventive approaches for patients with hereditary cancer syndromes such as familial adenomatous polyposis, Lynch Syndrome, and colorectal cancer. Through clinical trials, Cruz-Correa works on developing new drugs, treatments, and discovering new methods to support the growing community dedicated to cancer research. She has contributed to understanding how these conditions progress and has developed therapeutic approaches to intercept cancer development in high-risk patients. Her work also focuses on addressing disparities in cancer care and prevention. Cruz-Correa is a decorated scientist with more than 50 research publications.

Cruz-Correa served on the governing board of the American Association for Cancer Research (AACR), chaired the AACR Minorities in Cancer Research Council and Women in Cancer Research Council, and was elected to the governing boards of the American Association for Cancer Institutes and the Alliance Foundation for Clinical Oncology in 2021. In 2021, she became the first Puerto Rican woman elected to the honorary Association of American Physicians. In April 2022, Cruz-Correa became the first Latinx researcher to serve as Program Chair for the AACR Annual Meeting. As Program Chair, she played a role in shaping the scientific agenda, highlighting cancer health disparities and ensuring the inclusion of Latinx researchers and issues affecting Latinx communities. The meeting, which featured over 15,000 in-person attendees, was the first AACR Annual Meeting to focus extensively on disparities across the cancer continuum, from prevention to survivorship.

From 2012 to 2018, Cruz-Correa was the founding president of the Puerto Rico Colorectal Cancer Coalition, a non-profit organization aimed at promoting awareness, education, and health policies to combat colorectal cancer in Puerto Rico. She has also served as a board member of the NCI National Cancer Advisory Board, having been appointed by U.S. president Barack Obama. In 2024, she participated in a new blog called "AcCELerate" with the National Cancer Institute where she advocates for health equity, detailing her passion for her work, her origin story into her field of work, and key steps for the research field to address health disparities within those fighting cancer.

In 2018, Cruz-Correa cofounded Pan American Center Oncology (PanOncology an organization focus on bringing Clinical Trials to Hispanic patients in Puerto Rico. The organization have conducted over 150 clinical trials helping to approve over 15 drugs by the FDA.

In 2023 Cruz-Correa was awarded Fellow of the American Association for the Advancement of Science.
