= Mieke Andela-Baur =

Dutch politician

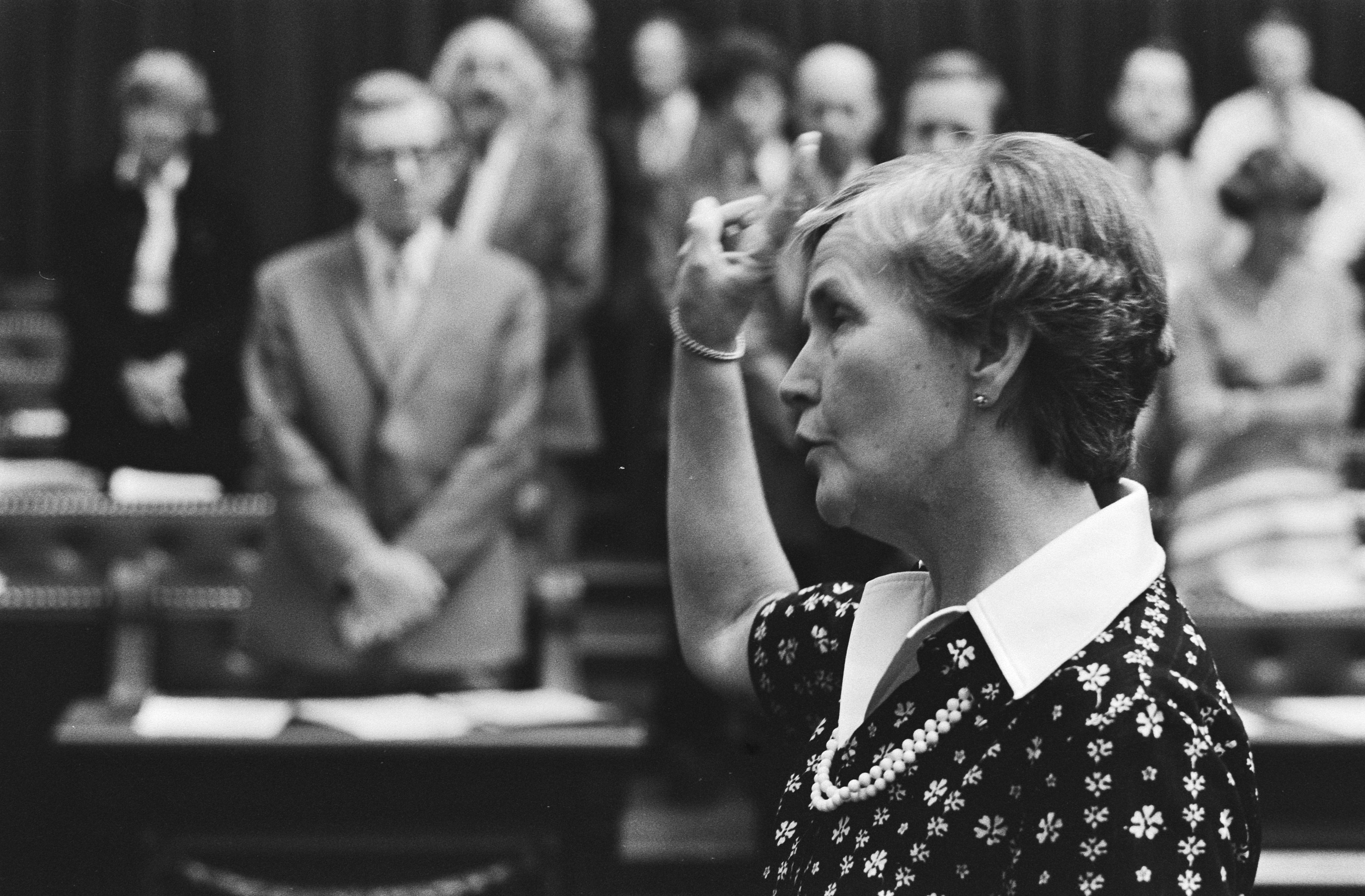
- Andela-Baur being sworn into the House of Representatives in 1978

Member of the House of Representatives
- In office 24 August 1976 – 8 June 1977; 30 August 1978 – 10 June 1981; 9 September 1981 – 16 September 1982; 11 November 1982 – 3 June 1986

Member of the municipal council of Franekeradeel
- In office 1 September 1970 – August 1976

Member of the States of Friesland
- In office 3 June 1970 – 7 June 1978

Personal details
- Born: 5 February 1923 Nieuwenhagen, Netherlands
- Died: 2 January 2016 (aged 92) Bolsward, Netherlands
- Party: Catholic People's Party (1948–1980), Christian Democratic Appeal (since 1980)

Maria Agnes Henriëtte "Mieke" Andela-Baur (5 February 1923 – 2 January 2016) was a Dutch politician, she served as member of the House of Representatives for the Christian Democratic Appeal between 1976 and 1986. Before her time in the House she was active in the municipal politics of Franekeradeel and in the States of Friesland.

== Career ==
Baur was born on 5 February 1923 in Nieuwenhagen. She followed her primary education in Nieuwenhagen and later attended the HBS in Roermond. Afterwards the attended the rural domestic science school in Posterholt until 1945.

Baur married in 1948 and took up the name of her husband, who was a farmer. The couple had a total of ten children. Andela-Baur worked on the farm and as a teacher at the domestic science school. Andela-Baur, a Roman Catholic, was chair of the Catholic Rural Wives until 1976.

In 1948 she joined the Catholic People's Party. She ran for political office in 1970 and was elected to the States of Friesland and later the same year to the municipal council of Franekeradeel as well. She was a member of the States between 3 June 1970 and 7 June 1978, and of the municipal council from 1 September 1970 to August 1976.

Between 1976 and 1986 Andela-Baur served four stints in the House of Representatives for first the Catholic People's Party and from 1980 onwards for the Christian Democratic Appeal. Her terms in office were between: 24 August 1976 – 8 June 1977, 30 August 1978 – 10 June 1981, 9 September 1981 – 16 September 1982, and finally from 11 November 1982 to 3 June 1986. In the House she was amongst other topics occupied with healthcare, cultural minorities and the West Frisian language.

Andela-Baur was made an Officer in the Order of Orange-Nassau on 29 April 1988. She died on 2 January 2016 in Bolsward, aged 92.
