= Lundy Braun =

Professor of pathology

- Died: August 9th 2024; Rhode Island, US
- Education: Johns Hopkins Bloomberg School of Public Health
- Occupation: Pathologist
- Medical career
- Profession: Professor Emerita
- Institutions: Brown University
- Research: Africana studies; Race adjustment
- Awards: Ludwik Fleck Prize (2018)

Lundy Braun was a professor of pathology and laboratory medicine, and Africana studies at Brown University, United States, who researched history of racial health disparities. She wrote Breathing Race Into the Machine: The Surprising Career of the Spirometer From Plantation to Genetics (2014), which looks at the history of correcting for race in spirometers, and for which she received the Ludwik Fleck Prize in 2018.

== Career ==
Lundy Braun received her PhD from Johns Hopkins Bloomberg School of Public Health in 1982.

Braun studied differences in health relating to race, and was professor of pathology and laboratory medicine and Africana studies. Her reviews of research around algorithms using race adjustments found that race is not often defined, and she raised the question of the role of race in medicine. Her research paper "Defining race/ethnicity and explaining difference in research studies on lung function", published in the European Respiratory Journal in 2012, looked at almost 100 years of research pertaining to lung disease.

She wrote Breathing Race Into the Machine: The Surprising Career of the Spirometer From Plantation to Genetics (2014), which looked at the history of correcting for race in spirometers, and for which she received the Ludwik Fleck Prize in 2018.

In 2023, she retired and became professor emerita. On August 9, 2024, at the age of 77, she was killed after being struck by an automobile while walking near her home.

== Selected publications ==
- Braun, Lundy; Wolfgang, Melanie; Dickersin, Kay (1 January 2012). "Defining race/ethnicity and explaining difference in research studies on lung function". European Respiratory Journal. 41 (6): 1362–1370. doi:10.1183/09031936.00091612. ISSN 0903-1936. PMID 22878881. S2CID 3092122. (Co-author)
- Braun, L. (2015). "Race, ethnicity and lung function: A brief history". Canadian Journal of Respiratory Therapy. 51 (4): 99–101. ISSN 1205-9838. PMC 4631137. PMID 26566381.
- Braun, L. (24 October 2020). "Race Correction and Spirometry: Why History Matters". Chest. 159 (4): 1670–1675. doi:10.1016/j.chest.2020.10.046. ISSN 0012-3692. PMID 33263290.
