= Race adjustment =

Race adjustment, also known as race-correction, is the calculating of a result which takes into account race. It is commonly used in medical algorithms in several specialties, including cardiology, nephrology, urology, obstetrics, endocrinology, oncology and respiratory medicine. Examples include the eGFR to assess kidney function, the STONE score for the prediction of kidney stones, the FRAX tool, to evaluate the 10-year probability of bone fracture risk, lung function tests, to identify the severity of lung disease, and adjusting X-ray exposure for diagnostic imaging, giving Black patients higher doses than White people.

== History ==
Racially-biased discourse was pervasive in the development of Western medical thought. Carl Linnaeus, a Swedish physician, labeled five varieties of the human species by their physiognomic characteristics. He included characteristics such as hair type and skin thickness, but also relative characteristics relating to greed, honor, and laziness.

Charles White. an English physician and surgeon, further believed that different races were aligned on a "Great Chain of Being". His beliefs espoused different origins for different races, claiming that white and black people were different species entirely. While others, such as French naturalist Georges-Louis Leclerc and German anatomist Johann Blumenbach believed all races came from a single origin point, but that the races degenerated over time to form distinct differences based on environmental factors. Others like Thomas Jefferson believed that there was obvious racial inferiority between white and Black persons, calling on science to explore it further. While Charles Darwin believed in the basic equality of the human species, his ideas were adapted by social theorists like Francis Galton who coined the term eugenics in his book Inquiries into Human Faculty and Its Development published in 1883.

=== Influence of slavery and eugenics on medical practices ===
Perceived differences in race were used to justify slavery in the United States and these beliefs impacted medical treatment and experimentation on Black persons in the United States. Medical treatment of Black persons in the United States came into specific focus after 1808, after a federal ban on slave imports was implemented. Physicians such as J Marion Sims started to focus on the existing Black population, attempting to observe and use Black slaves for medical reasons. Some of these treatments and experiments were for the broader medical community, others were to increase birth rates and therefore domestic slave populations. Sims, for instance, the father of modern gynecology, performed surgery on twelve women in the 1840s from his backyard in Montgomery, Alabama. All of the women were enslaved. As modern medical science grew, it developed in conjunction with notions of racism, derived from both experiments and societal sentiments. These factors embedded a sense of racial difference and inequity that persists today. In the modern United States, for instance, Black women are sometimes three to four times more likely to die from issues during pregnancy compared to white women.

Experimentation was widespread among medical students and professionals alike. In the 19th century, many American medical schools used Black bodies stolen through grave robbing for dissection and medical experimentation. This thought process of viewing Black bodies and persons, alive or dead, as an "other", ripe for experimentation, persisted well into the Jim Crow era. For instance, the Tuskegee Experiment, initiated in 1932 and ending in 1972, infected Black men with syphilis against their knowledge, leading to over 100 deaths.

This experimentation went hand in hand with a legacy of colonialism. Colonies served as ample testing grounds for medical advancements by European and North American medical professionals. Honor Smith, a British physician at Oxford University, was jovial about the opportunity to test on colonial populations; in 1955, he stated, "[I]t is the almost unlimited field that Africa offers for clinical research that I find so enthralling…problems of the first interest abound, [and] clinical material is unlimited."

These experiments coincided with developments in anthropology and theory around race, with many prevalent thinkers of the time believing there to be distinct differences, even distinct origins between different races. After World War II, scientific racism and eugenics began to be dismissed at large by the scientific community. While certain experiments and explicitly eugenicist thought continued, many of the theories surrounding racial difference and eugenic superiority were discredited and pushed out of the mainstream. Certain medical practices such as equations and decision-making tools continued with these biases in mind. As the internet developed, diagnostic tools were often based on decision-making tools embedded with a perceived racial difference. In the 21st century, these tools and methods have come under more scrutiny. The disproportionate effects of Covid-19 on Black Americans as well as the case of police brutality against George Floyd in 2020 incited further research into the impact of race adjustment in medicine.

== Race adjustment in different medical fields ==
Adjustments for race are commonly used in several medical specialties, including cardiology, nephrology, urology, obstetrics, endocrinology, oncology and respiratory medicine. Examples include the eGFR to assess kidney function, the STONE score for the prediction of kidney stones, the FRAX tool, to evaluate the 10-year probability of bone fracture risk, and lung function tests, to identify the severity of lung disease.

=== Nephrology ===
The estimated glomerular filtration rate (eGFR) is a measure of kidney function. Adding a race adjustment to kidney algorithms results in higher eGFR values in people identified as black. Reasons for this vary, but it is thought to partially stem from the notion that Black persons are more muscular. This idea has come under greater scrutiny, with certain institutions choosing to deviate from the race-adjusted model as a result.

Kidney transplants also have racial implications, both direct and indirect. The Kidney Donor Risk Index (KDRI), the United States' official kidney allocation index, was developed in 2014. Race is among the factors used to predict the success of a kidney graft, with Black donors' kidneys often thought to perform worse than kidneys from other donors. Being Black results in a demarcation as a less preferable donor by the KDRI. This creates a snowball effect, with less kidneys from Black donors in the system. In turn, Black people in need of kidney donations are affected. Black people already face longer wait times than people of other races in need of kidney transplants. Black people are more likely to receive a kidney transplant from a Black donor, according to recent studies. This lack of resources can exacerbate the already lengthy wait times. In recent years, some professionals have called attention to these disparities, advocating to replace "the vagaries associated with inclusion of a variable termed 'race'."

=== Obstetrics ===
In the United States, African American and Hispanic women continue to have higher rates of cesarean section than do white women in the US. Medical decision making formulas such as the Vaginal Birth after Cesarean (VBAC) algorithm have been found to contribute to such disparities for women of color. The VBAC is used to estimate success rates for vaginal birth among expectant mothers with histories of previous cesarean delivery and is used by clinicians to counsel whether to offer trials of labor or repeat cesarean section. There are two race-based correction factors incorporated in the formula, one for African American women and one for Hispanic women. These factors are subtracted from the likelihood of having a successful vaginal birth after Cesarean and thus inherently predict a lower risk of vaginal birth success for African American and Hispanic individuals. These lower estimates may discourage health providers from offering trials of vaginal labor to expectant women of color, although the health benefits of vaginal birth (lower rates of surgical complication, faster recovery, fewer complication in later pregnancies) have been well documented. These race/ethnicity associations have been challenged by health providers since they have not been thoroughly supported by biology and are concerning as black women have higher rates of maternal mortality.

=== Pulmonology ===
Spirometers are devices that measure lung volume and airflow. They are used for the diagnosis and monitoring of several respiratory diseases such as asthma and chronic obstructive pulmonary disease (COPD). For most of the past two decades, spirometers were programmed to use "race-specific" reference values to normalize lower lung function typically observed in individual who self-identify as Black (10-15%) or Asian (4-6%). There have been several concerns about equity in these lung function formulas including the misdiagnosis of disease severity in asthma and COPD. Recent interest in investigating the basis for why these correction factors came to be spawned a systematic review of 226 articles published between 1922 and 2008 that found that less than one in five studies defined race and that researchers frequently assumed inherent or genetic differences. These assumptions of genetic factors date back to when Samuel Cartwright attributed the lower lung function of enslaved Black people, which was measured with a spirometer, to differences in nature rather than the work conditions to which enslaved individuals were subjected.

Supporters of using race adjustment in lung function argue that despite its imperfections, correcting for race results in a more precise calculation of lung function and that not including the adjustment may result in misdiagnosis. Others warn that a race-specific approach normalizes differences that might be due to socioeconomic inequalities including the disproportionate impact of pollution on racialized individuals.

In 2023, the American Thoracic Society and the European Respiratory Society endorsed a new race-neutral averaged approach to interpretation of lung function testing results. In the United States, switching from race-specific to race-neutral equations was estimated to affect disease classifications, occupational eligibility, and disability compensation for millions of people. Debates around the incompatibility between different definitions of race-neutrality and its implications for an equitable approach to lung function testing has continued.

== AI and race adjustment ==
Various technologies categorized as 'artificial intelligence' or 'AI' have been introduced into healthcare settings to assist doctors in forming a diagnosis. Despite common assumptions that computers are automatically more objective than humans, AI algorithms have been shown to perpetuate biases based on the data they are trained on. Diagnostic AI may draw on past medical data adjusted for race during computation, which can yield racially biased outputs. How developers choose to label data and which variables a model weighs more heavily can also contribute to algorithmic bias.

Those seeking to remove racial biases from clinical algorithms face considerable challenges. For instance, even if race is not explicitly included as an input variable, algorithms could still use data strongly associated with race, like postal code, which may yield an outcome similar to that of race adjustment.

Still, research is actively being conducted to develop ways to mitigate algorithmic bias. The Total Product Lifecycle (TPLC) approach, a framework created by the U.S. Food and Drug Administration (FDA) to establish safety and equity in medical devices, offers one model for evaluating bias throughout the development of clinical AI. An adaption of this model intended for epidemiologists and health data scientists assesses the potential for biases and ways to mitigate them in each phase of developing an algorithm, from conception to dissemination. Another method proposed to make diagnostic AI more equitable is by “levelling up," which implements race adjustment in a way that increases rates of diagnosis for largely underdiagnosed populations while considering the possible risks and benefits of each clinical context.

== Advocacy for change ==
As understanding of race and ethnicity has evolved, advocates for change, such as Lundy Braun, have questioned the assumptions that some medical decision-making tools and formulas are based upon. These formulas have been documented to result in the denial of certain resources and treatment options to people identified as black. However, Neil R. Powe, professor of medicine and researcher in health disparities and co-author on a study of the implications of omitting the race adjustment in eGFR calculations, highlights the risks in leaving it out.

In recent years, students, petitions and social media campaigns have recently been at the forefront for driving medical institutions to change the way they utilize certain clinical decision-making tools such as eGFR calculations. In 2017, Beth Israel Medical Centre eliminated the race factor in calculating kidney function. In May 2020, through medical student advocacy to their administration, the University of Washington transitioned to a new eGFR calculation that excludes race as a variable.

== See also ==
- Race and health
- Race and health in the United States
