= Landgraaf =

Landgraaf Lankgraaf
- Municipality
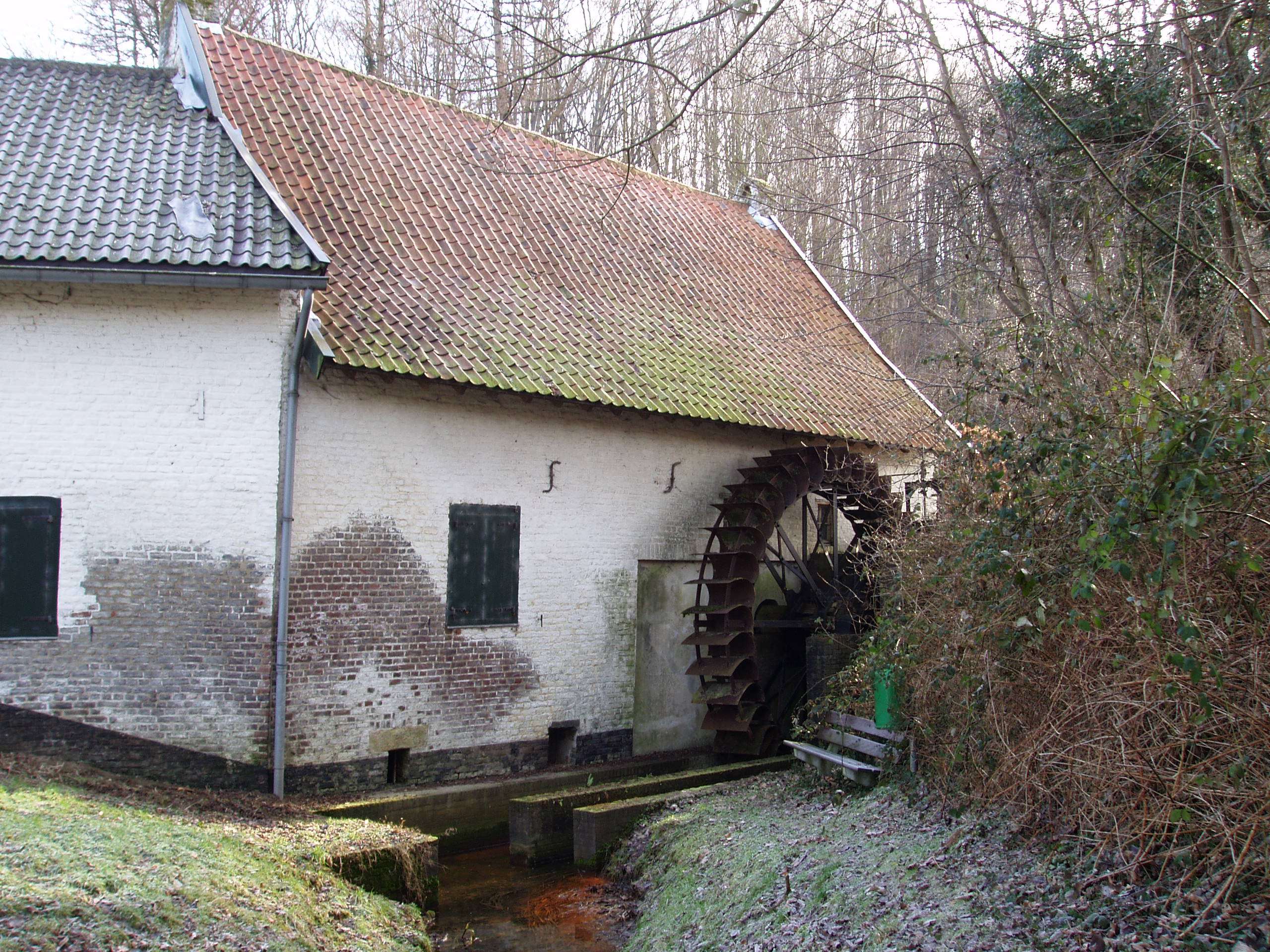
- Watermill at Strijthagen castle

- Flag Coat of arms

- Location in Limburg
- Coordinates: 50°54′N 6°1′E
- Country: Netherlands
- Province: Limburg

Government
  - Body: Municipal council
  - Mayor: Richard de Boer (VVD)

Area
  - Total: 24.67 km^{2} (9.53 sq mi)
  - Land: 24.58 km^{2} (9.49 sq mi)
  - Water: 0.09 km^{2} (0.035 sq mi)
- Elevation: 161 m (528 ft)

Population (January 2021)
  - Total: 37,262
  - Density: 1,516/km^{2} (3,930/sq mi)
- Demonym: Landgravenaar
- Time zone: UTC+1 (CET)
  - Summer (DST): UTC+2 (CEST)
- Postcode: 6370–6374
- Area code: 045
- Website: landgraaf.nl

Landgraaf (Dutch: [ˈlɑntxraːf]; Limburgish: Lankgraaf [ˈlɑŋkxʀaːf]) is a municipality in southeastern Limburg, Netherlands, forming part of the Parkstad Limburg agglomeration. SnowWorld is the largest indoor ski piste in Europe.

== Population centres ==
- Nieuwenhagen
- Schaesberg
- Ubach over Worms

=== Topography ===
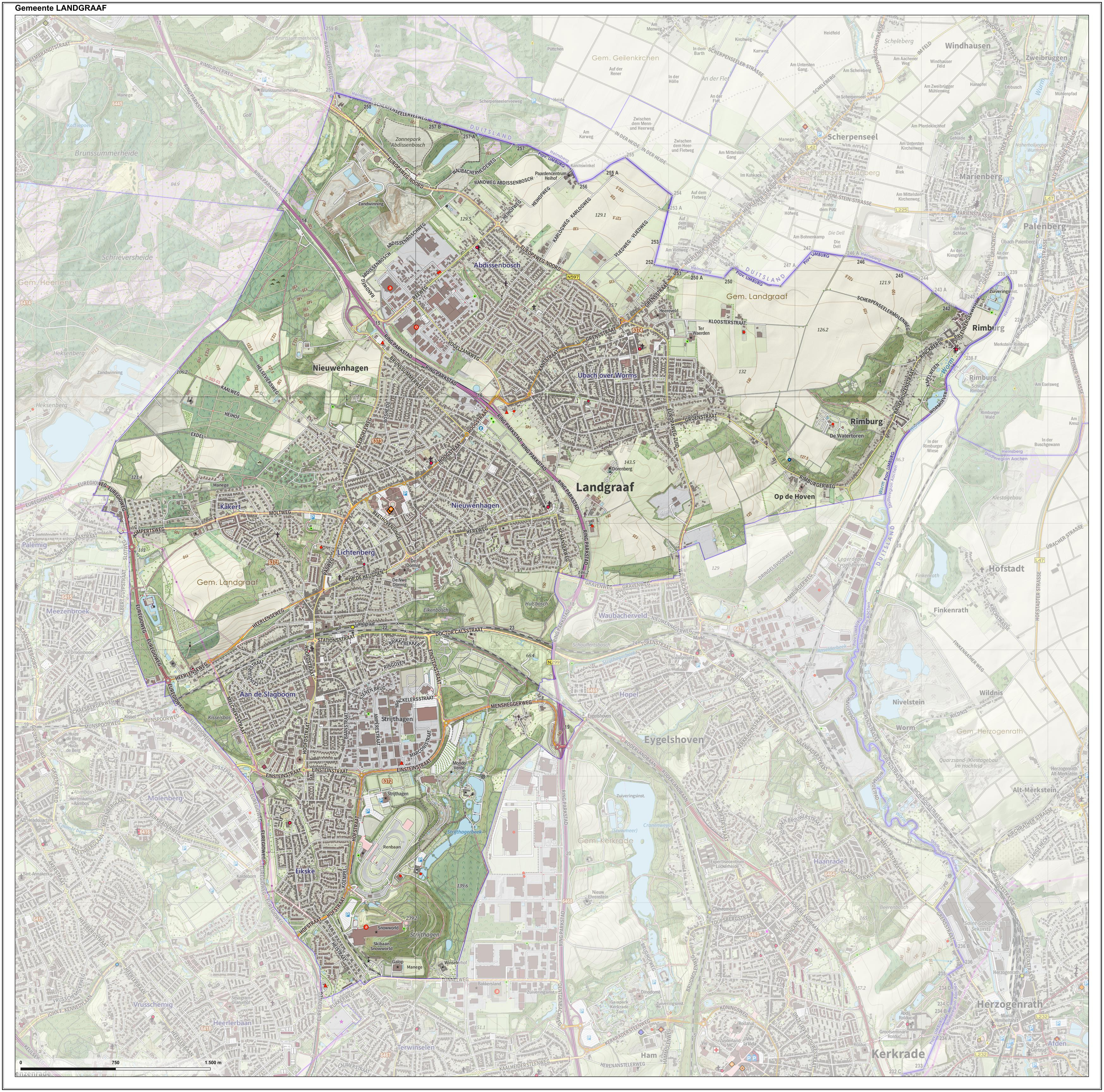

Dutch topographic map of the municipality of Landgraaf, June 2015

== Attractions ==
A pop music festival called Pinkpop is held annually on the Pentecost weekend in Schaesberg, a town in Landgraaf.

Landgraaf is home to the largest indoor ski piste in Europe, called SnowWorld.

== Notable natives ==
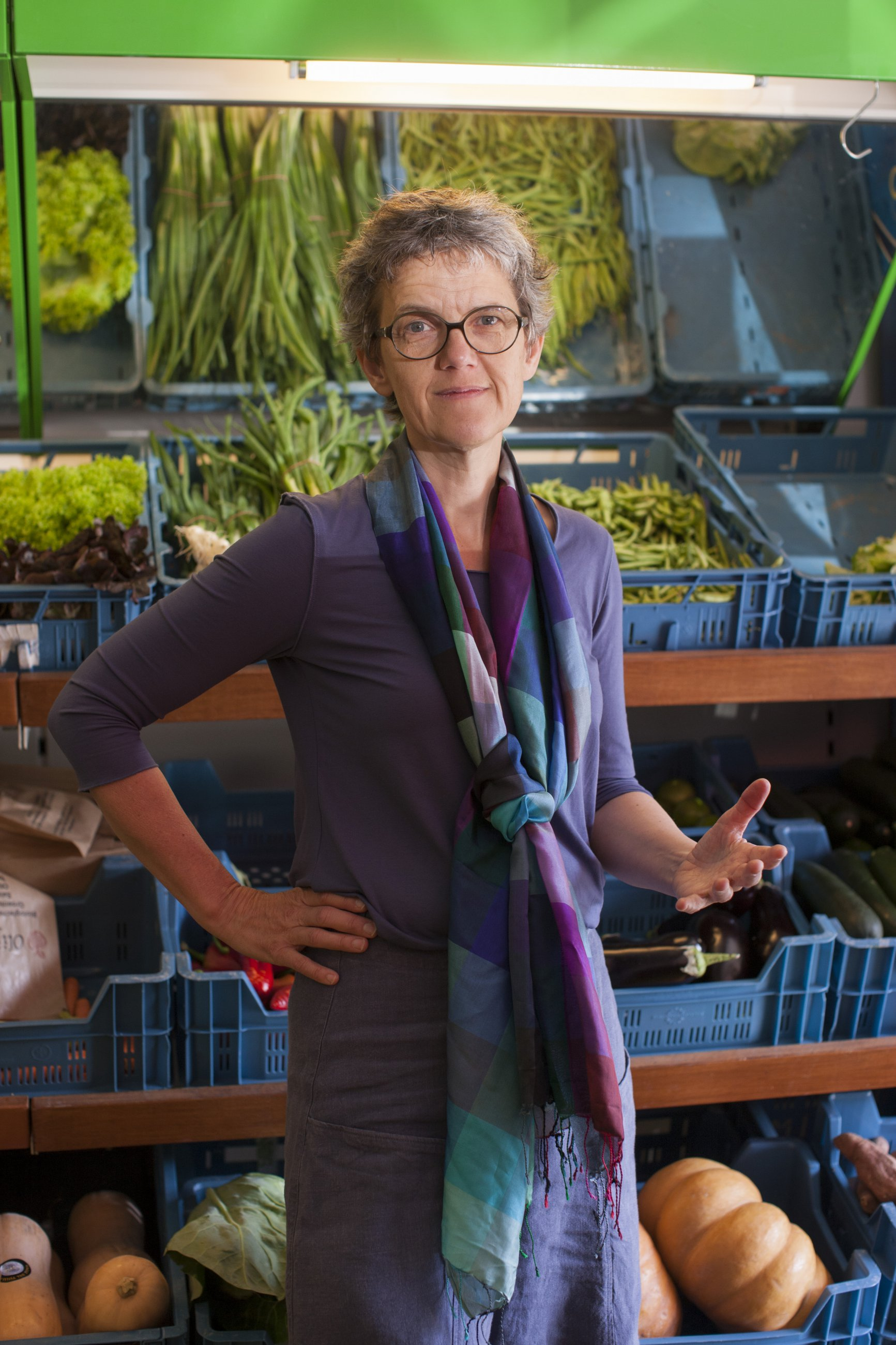
Annemarie Mol, 2012

- Johan Kremers (born 1933 in Nieuwenhagen) a Queen's Commissioner of Limburg from 1977 to 1990
- Harry Kempen (1937 in Nieuwenhagen – 2000) a cultural psychologist and academic
- Joep Lange (1954 in Nieuwenhagen – 2014) a Dutch clinical researcher in HIV therapy, International AIDS Society from 2002 to 2004
- Annemarie Mol (born 1958 in Schaesberg) a Dutch ethnographer, philosopher and academic
- Henk Blezer (born 1961 in Schaesberg) a Dutch Tibetologist, Indologist, and scholar of Buddhist studies
- Sharon Walraven (born 1970 in Schaesberg) a Dutch wheelchair tennis player, silver medallist at the 2000 Paralympics and gold medallist at the 2008 Paralympics
- Carach Angren (formed 2003 in Landgraaf) is a symphonic black metal band

== See also ==
- List of mayors of Landgraaf

== Gallery ==
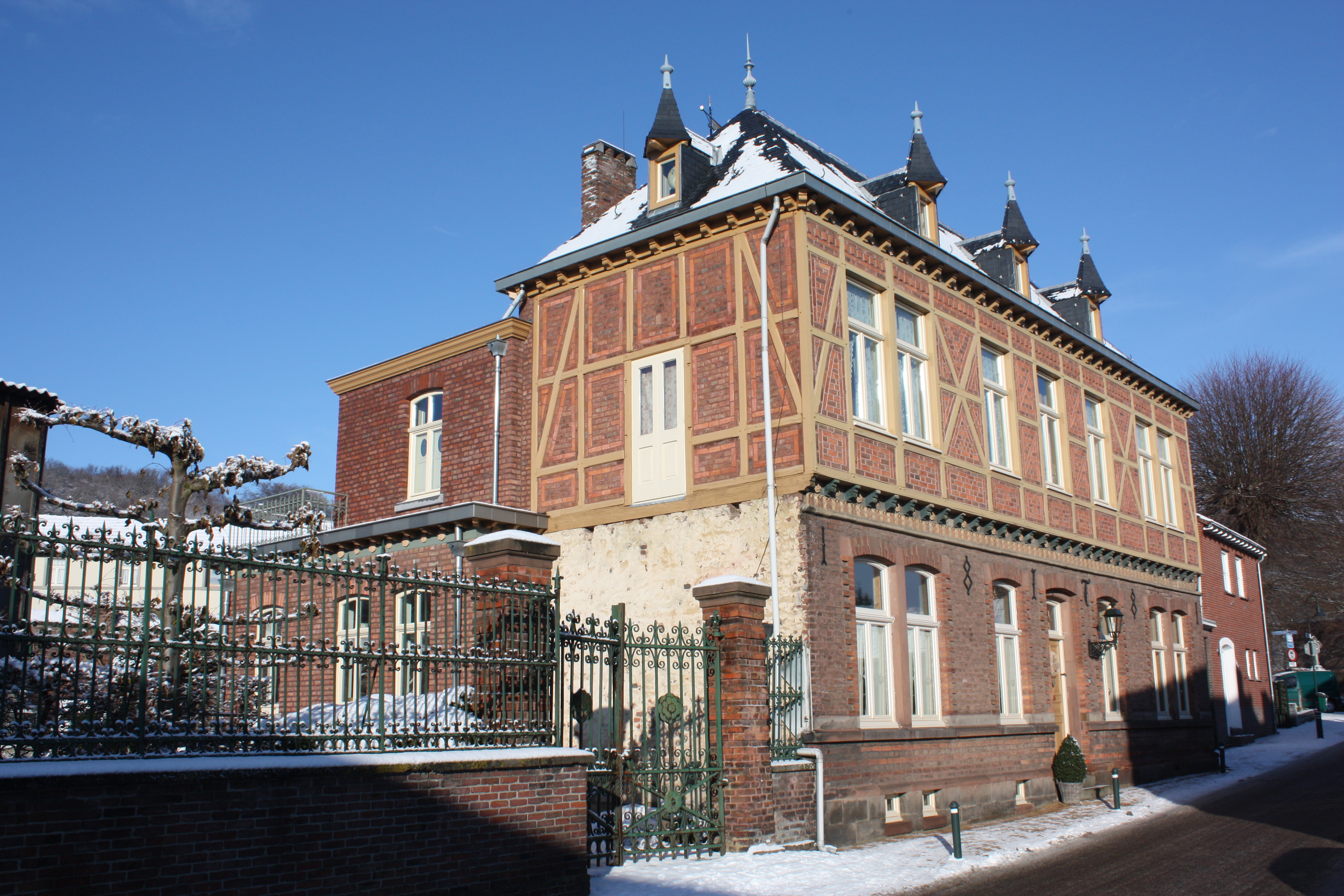
Woonhuis Broekhuizenstraat, Landgraaf

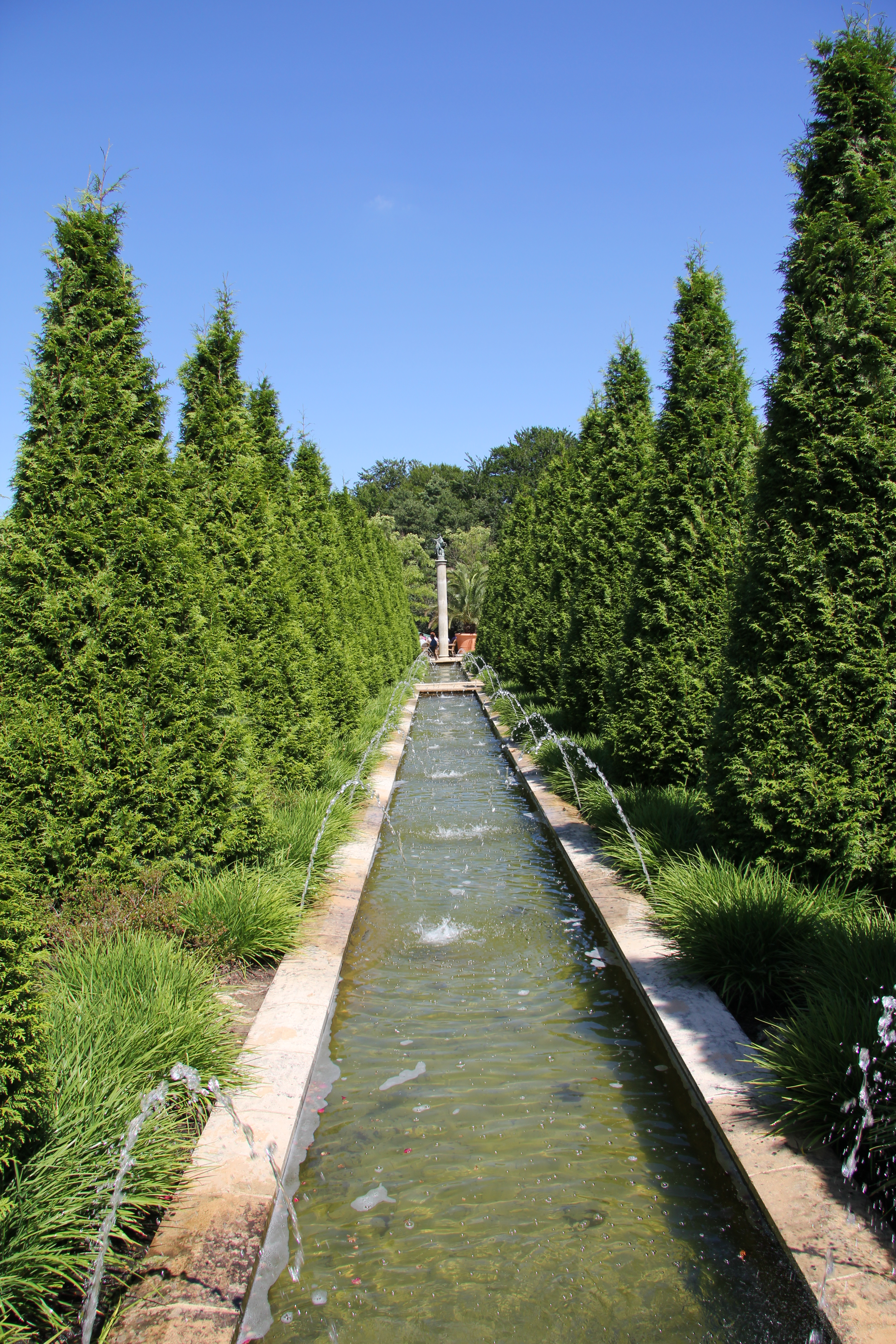
Im Freizeitpark - Mondo Verde

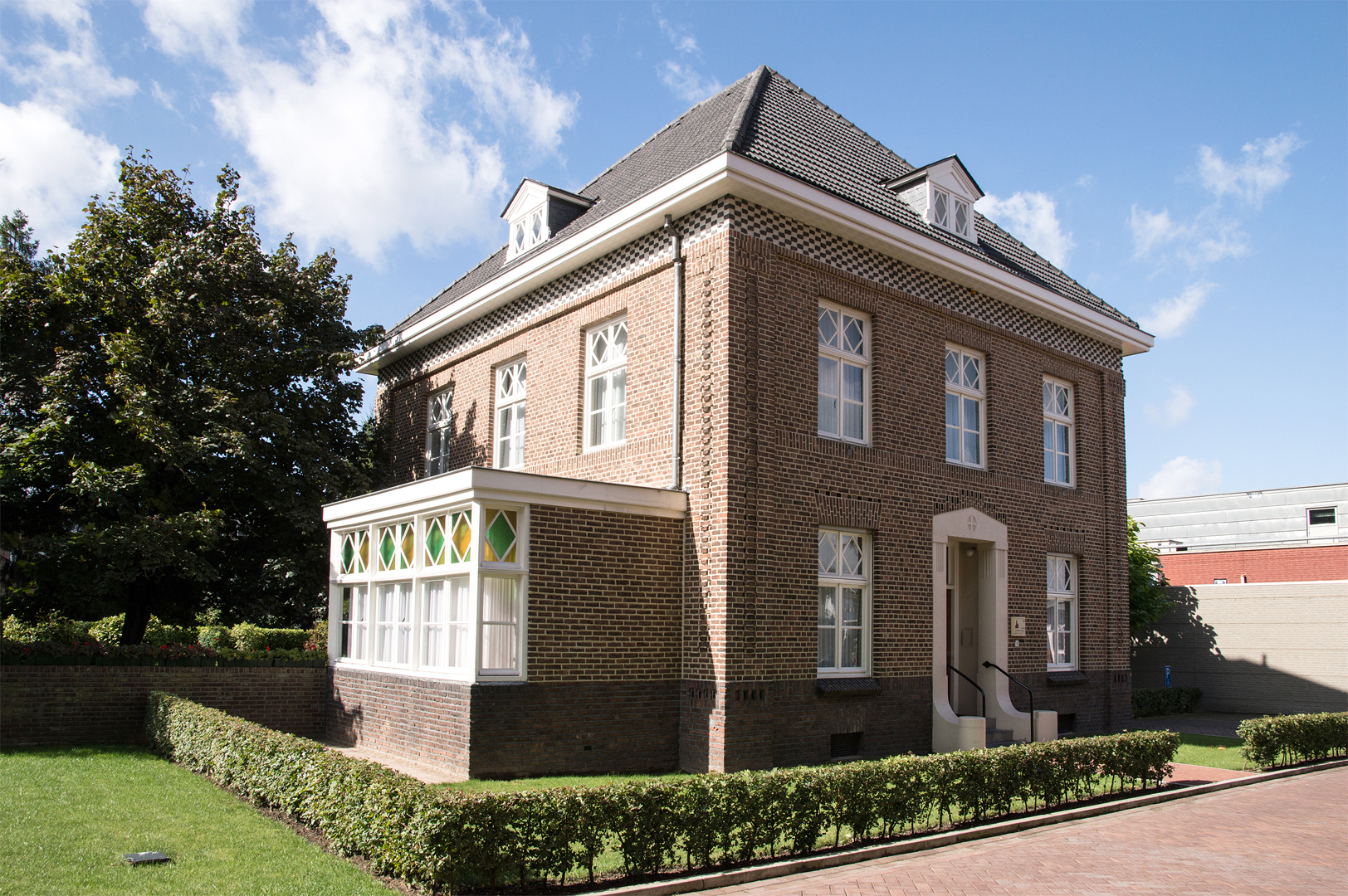
Pastorie Nieuwenhagerheide Hoogstraat

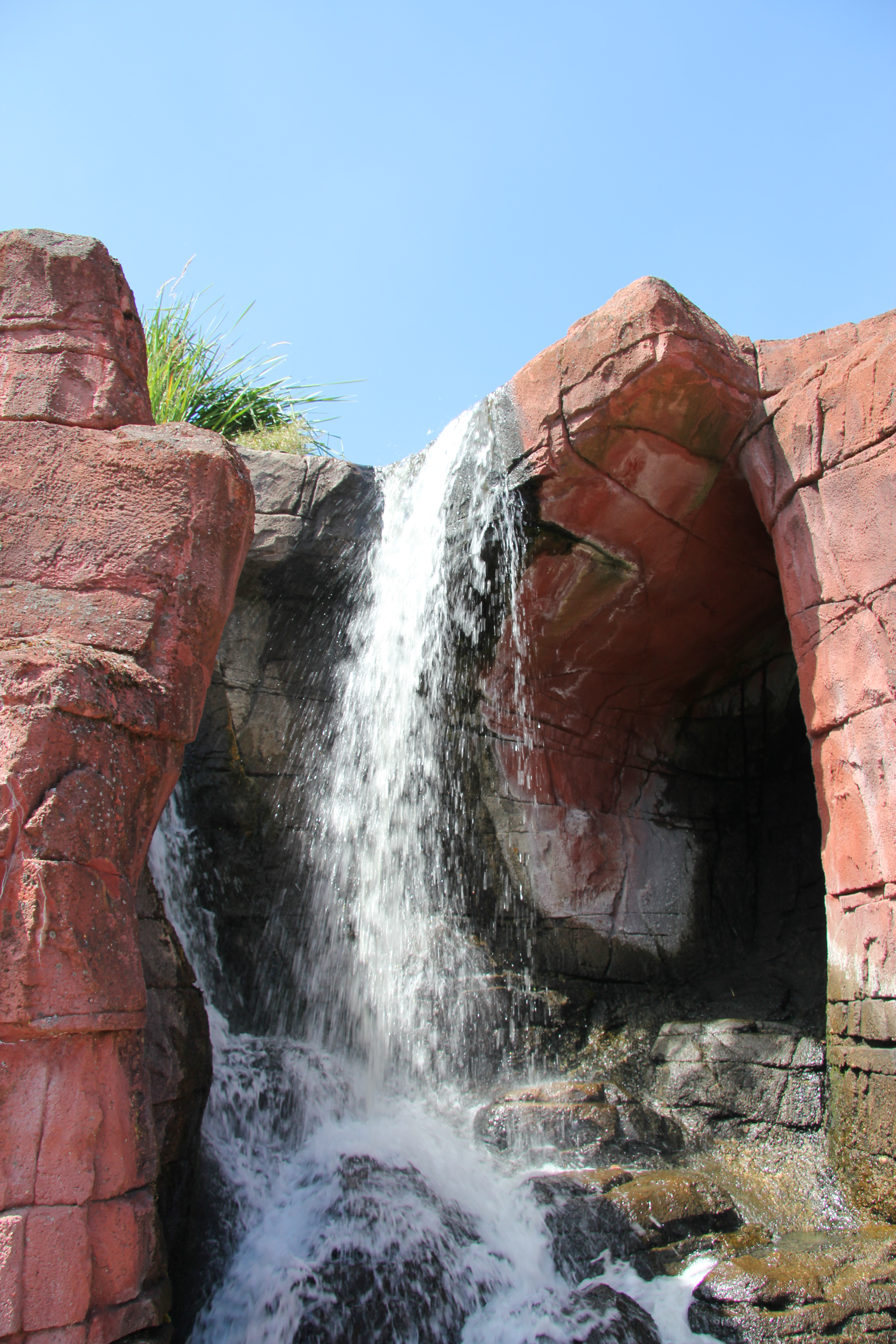
Im Freizeitpark - Mondo Verde

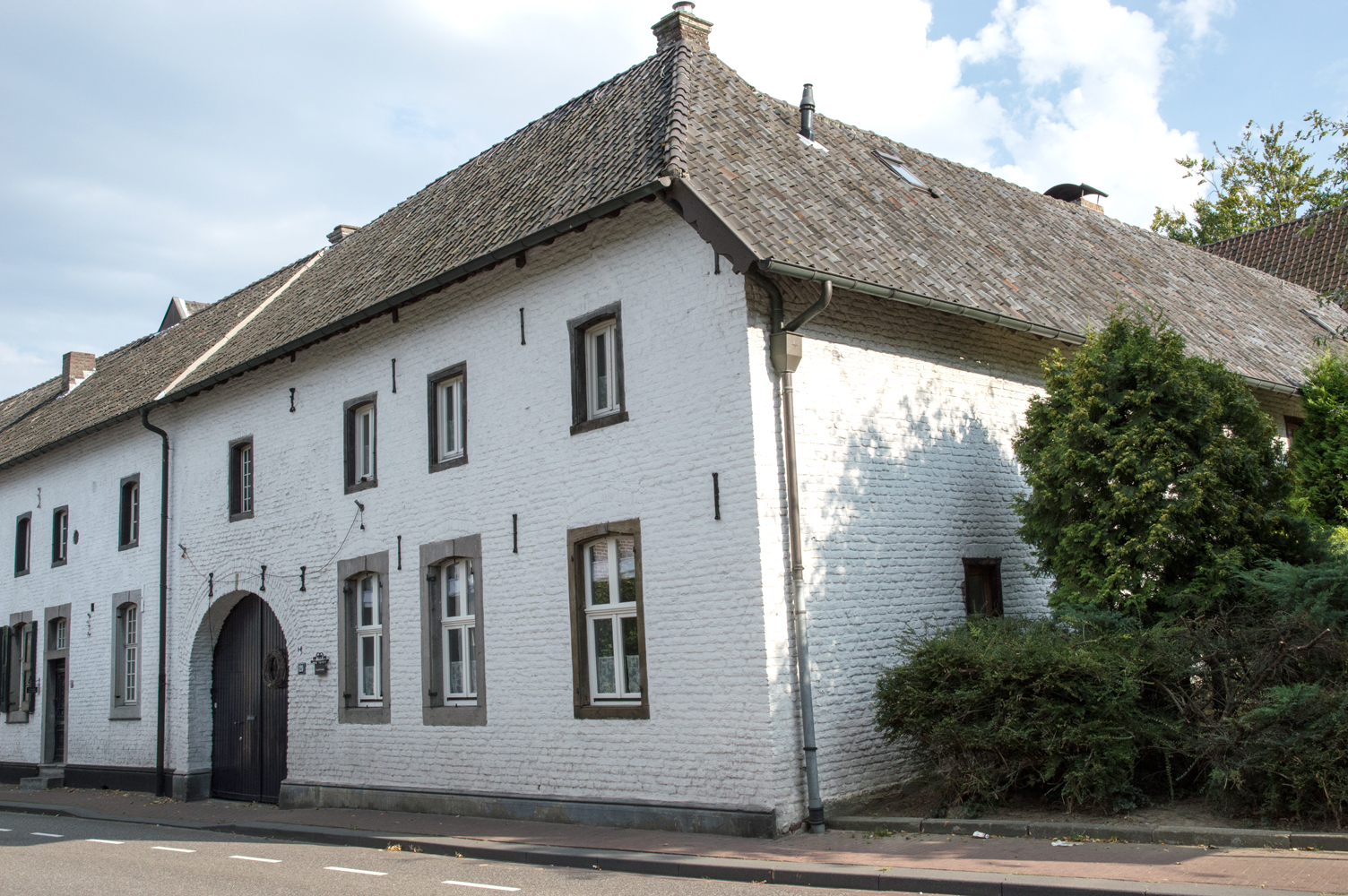
Grensstraat 129 gevel, Landgraaf-Waubach
