= M. Murphy =

Canadian philosopher

- Born: Claudette Michelle Murphy; 1969
- Education: Harvard University; University of Toronto
- Known for: Regimes of imperceptibility, environmental justice
- Awards: Ludwik Fleck Prize (2008 and 2019)
- Scientific career
- Fields: History of science, philosophy of science
- Workplaces: University of Toronto

External videos
- “Abduction, Reproduction, and Postcolonial Infrastructures of Data”, M. Murphy, S&F Online

M. Murphy (born 1969) is a Canadian academic. They are a professor of environment and women and gender studies at the University of Toronto and co-director of the Technoscience Research Unit.

Murphy is known for their work on regimes of imperceptibility, or the ways in which different forms of knowledge become visible or invisible in the scientific community and broader society. Murphy has published several books, including Sick Building Syndrome and the Problem of Uncertainty: Environmental Politics, Technoscience, and Women Workers (2006) which won the Ludwik Fleck Prize from the Society for Social Studies of Science, Seizing the Means of Reproduction: Entanglements of Feminism, Health, and Technoscience (2012), and The Economization of Life (2017).

== Early life and education ==
Murphy was born in 1969 and grew up in Winnipeg, Manitoba. Their family background includes Métis and French heritage.

Murphy was inspired by the work of feminists in science in the mid-eighties, including Donna Haraway and Ruth Hubbard. They earned a bachelor's degree in biology, history, and philosophy of science and technology from the University of Toronto in 1992. They earned a Ph.D. from Harvard University in 1998. Their experience at Harvard led them to incorporate analysis of whiteness explicitly into their work on science.

In the 1990s, Murphy worked with Evelynn M. Hammonds and her working group on race and science at MIT. From 1996 to 2007, they edited RaceSci, a website on anti-racist studies in science, medicine, and technology. With Adele Clarke and others at the Society for the Social Studies of Science, they organized panels on race and science.

== Career ==
Murphy is interested in feminist technoscience. They study the recent history of science and technology with particular attention to economics, capitalism, the environment, and reproduction, with an awareness of colonialism, feminism, gender, race, and queer theory.

They focus on Canada, the United States, Bangladesh, and issues around chemical exposure, environmental justice, and reproductive justice. Landscapes of Exposure: Knowledge and Illness in Modern Environments, which they co-edited with Gregg Mitman and Chris Sellers in 2004, has been called "a foundational volume in bringing historical and social science perspectives to bear on the intersection of place and disease."

Murphy is known for the concept of regimes of imperceptibility, a framework for examining the ways in which different forms of knowledge become visible or invisible within scientific communities and society:

By analyzing "regimes of perceptibility", she reveals how the politics of knowledge production and the process of materialization involve obscuring awareness of certain things in order to make others more pronounced, known, and thus controllable [...] Murphy demonstrates how the power-laden raced/classed/gendered regimes of perceptibility also create "domains of imperceptibility" that may be acted upon as an inventive space.

They develop these ideas in Sick Building Syndrome and the Problem of Uncertainty: Environmental Politics, Technoscience, and Women Workers (2006). They trace the history of sick building syndrome (SBS), a diagnosis applied to mass health complaints by office workers for which no cause can be identified. They examine the ways in which the identification of a new disease was affected by "a congeries of unlikely forces" including both scientific and social factors. The identification and acceptance of SBS, an inherently uncertain diagnosis, involves gender, race, and power dynamics within "normal science." They also look at the presentation of information in ways that draw on traditions from the labour and feminist movements. They received the Ludwik Fleck Prize in 2008 from the Society for Social Studies of Science for this book.

Murphy is also the author of Seizing the Means of Reproduction: Entanglements of Feminism, Health, and Technoscience (2012). Their starting point is the work of radical feminists in the United States in the 1970s and 1980s, who advocated for alternative health techniques and feminist clinics. They place these developments in a broader framework, examining relationships between feminism, imperialism, capitalism, population control, and neoliberalism. It has been praised for identifying critical junctures that were previously overlooked, and for its examination of how the "economy of reproduction" operates in both developed and developing worlds.

Murphy has written several times about "distributed reproduction", a theorization of reproduction that extends beyond the individual.

Their book The Economization of Life (2017) explores the 20th century rise of techniques to value life based on economic and biopolitical concerns. Murphy examines the techniques and epistemologies that have been used to describe and connect ideas of populations and economics in the United States and Bangladesh. This book was awarded the Ludwik Fleck Prize, making Murphy the first person to receive the award multiple times.

Murphy has also worked on the concept of "alterlife" in the ongoing aftermath of the effects of chemical industry damage especially in the Great Lakes region.

== Books ==
- Murphy, M. (2017). The Economization of Life. Durham, N.C.: Duke University Press. ISBN 978-0822363453.
- Murphy, M. (2012). Seizing the means of reproduction: entanglements of feminism, health, and technoscience. Durham, N.C.: Duke University Press. ISBN 978-0822353362.
- Murphy, M. (2006). Sick building syndrome and the problem of uncertainty: environmental politics, technoscience, and women workers. Durham, N.C.: Duke University Press. ISBN 978-0822336716.
- Mitman, Gregg; Murphy, M.; Sellers, Christopher, eds. (2004). Landscapes of exposure: knowledge and illness in modern environments. Washington, D.C.: Georgetown University. ISBN 9780226532516.

== Awards ==
- Geddes W. Simpson Distinguished Lecturer, University of Maine, 2010
- Jackman Humanities Research Fellowship, University of Toronto, 2009
- Ludwik Fleck Prize, Society for Social Studies of Science, 2008
- Michelle Clayman Gender Research Institute Senior Research Fellowship, Stanford University, 2007
- Ludwik Fleck Prize, Society for Social Studies of Science, 2019
- Fellowship, Royal Society of Canada
