= Alberto Cambrosio =

Alberto Cambrosio is a sociologist of biomedicine at McGill University. He earned his PhD in History and Sociology of Science from the Université de Montréal. He holds a bachelor's degree in Biology from the University of Basel, Switzerland, and a master's degree in Environmental Science from the Université de Sherbrooke, Canada.

He is widely published, and has written three books. In 2005, he received the Ludwik Fleck Prize from the Society for Social Studies of Science for his book Biomedical Platforms with historian Peter Keating.

He is Professor and former Chair of the Department of Social Studies of Medicine at McGill University. Since 2011 he has been a guest professor at the Center for the Sociology of Organizations in Paris, France.
