= Annemarie Mol =

Dutch ethnographer and philosopher

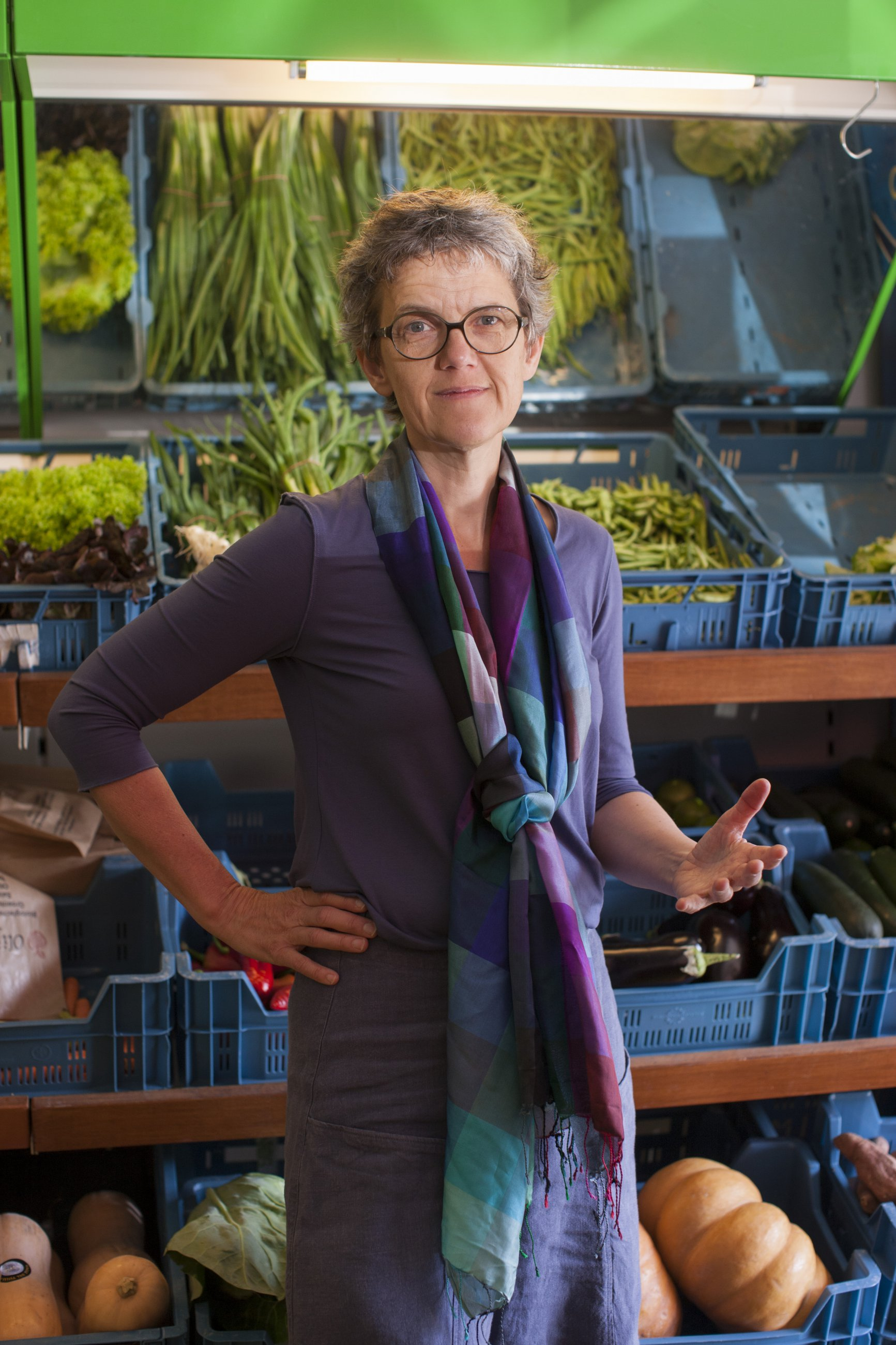
- Annemarie Mol (2012)
- Born: 13 September 1958 (age 68); Schaesberg, Netherlands
- Awards: Spinoza Prize (2012), Ludwik Fleck Prize (2004), Constantijn & Christiaan Huijgens Grant from the NWO (1990–1995)

Philosophical work
- Era: Contemporary philosophy
- Region: Western philosophy
- Institutions: University of Amsterdam
- Main interests: Ethnography, philosophy of healthcare and medicine
- Notable works: The Body Multiple: Ontology in Medical Practice (2002)

Annemarie Mol (born 13 September 1958) is a Dutch ethnographer and philosopher. She is the Professor of Anthropology of the Body at the University of Amsterdam.

Winner of the Constantijn & Christiaan Huijgens Grant from the NWO in 1990 to study 'Differences in Medicine', she was awarded a European Research Council Advanced Grant in 2010 to study 'The Eating Body in Western Practice and Theory'. She has helped to develop post-ANT/feminist understandings of science, technology and medicine. In her earlier work she explored the performativity of health care practices, argued that realities are generated within those practices, and noted that since practices differ, so too do realities. The body, as she expressed it, is multiple: it is more than one but it is also less than many (since the different versions of the body also overlap in health care practices). This is an empirical argument about ontology (which is the branch of philosophy that explores being, existence, or the categories of being.) As a part of this she also developed the notion of 'ontological politics', arguing that since realities or the conditions of possibility vary between practices, this means that they are not given but might be changed.

Mol has been a member of the Royal Netherlands Academy of Arts and Sciences since 2013.

Mol has written and worked with a range of scholars including John Law.

== Prizes ==
In 2004 she received the Ludwik Fleck Prize (Society for Social Studies of Science, 4S) for her book The Body Multiple.

In 2012 she was awarded the Spinoza Prize.

== Publications ==
- Mol, Annemarie; Berg, Marc (1998). Differences in medicine: unraveling practices, techniques, and bodies. Durham, North Carolina: Duke University Press. ISBN 9780822321743.
- Mol, Annemarie; Law, John (2002). Complexities: social studies of knowledge practices. Durham, North Carolina: Duke University Press. ISBN 9780822328469.
- Mol, Annemarie (2002). The Body Multiple: Ontology in Medical Practice. Durham, North Carolina: Duke University Press. ISBN 9780822329176.
- Mol, Annemarie (2008). The logic of care: health and the problem of patient choice. London New York: Routledge. ISBN 9780415453431.
- Mol, Annemarie (2021). Eating In Theory. Durham: Duke University Press. ISBN 9781478010371.

== Lectures ==
- Mol, Annemarie (2013); Alexander von Humboldt Lecture: What Methods Do.
