= Neil R. Powe =

American professor of medicine

- Education: Central High School; Princeton University; Harvard Medical School
- Occupation: Professor of medicine
- Medical career
- Field: Medicine
- Institutions: Johns Hopkins University School of Medicine; University of California, San Francisco; Zuckerberg San Francisco General Hospital and Trauma Center
- Research: Kidney disease; Cardiovascular disease; Health disparities

Neil R. Powe is an American professor of medicine at the University of California, San Francisco and the chief of medicine at the Zuckerberg San Francisco General Hospital and Trauma Center. Previously he was professor of medicine at the Johns Hopkins University School of Medicine. His research has mainly related to kidney disease, cardiovascular disease and health disparities.

== Biography ==
Neil R. Powe attended Central High School and is an alumnus in the school's Hall of Fame. He earned a bachelor's degree in biochemistry from Princeton University, a medical degree at Harvard Medical School and a master’s in public health at Harvard School of Public Health. He completed residency in internal medicine, was a Robert Wood Johnson Clinical Scholar and completed a master’s in business administration at the University of Pennsylvania.

In 1986 Powe joined the faculty of Johns Hopkins University School of Medicine and the Bloomberg School of Public Health, where he became the James F. Fries University distinguished professor.

In 2009, he joined the University of California San Francisco. He leads the University of California San Francisco Medicine Service at the Priscilla Chan and Mark Zuckerberg San Francisco General Hospital. In 2020, he co-authored a paper on the implications of removing race adjustment in kidney function calculations. In 2022, he received a Heros and Heart award from the San Francisco General Foundation for his work on health equity. In 2024, he was named by Time100Health as one of the most influential people in health.

== Awards and honors ==
- Fellow in the American Association for the Advancement of Science
- Diversity Award - Association of Professors of Medicine
- John M. Eisenberg Award for Career Achievement in Research - Society of General Internal Medicine
- Distinguished Educator Award - Association for Clinical Research Training
- Belding Scribner Award - American Society of Nephrology

== Selected publications ==
- Gross, Cary P.; Anderson, Gerard F.; Powe, Neil R. (17 June 1999). "The relation between funding by the National Institutes of Health and the burden of disease". The New England Journal of Medicine. 340 (24): 1881–1887. doi:10.1056/NEJM199906173402406. ISSN 0028-4793. PMID 10369852. (Co-author)
- Garg, Pushkal P.; Frick, Kevin D.; Diener-West, Marie; Powe, Neil R. (25 November 1999). "Effect of the ownership of dialysis facilities on patients' survival and referral for transplantation". The New England Journal of Medicine. 341 (22): 1653–1660. doi:10.1056/NEJM199911253412205. ISSN 0028-4793. PMID 10572154. (Co-author)
- Thiemann, David R.; Coresh, Josef; Oetgen, William J.; Powe, Neil R. (27 May 1999). "The association between hospital volume and survival after acute myocardial infarction in elderly patients". The New England Journal of Medicine. 340 (21): 1640–1648. doi:10.1056/NEJM199905273402106. ISSN 0028-4793. PMID 10341277. (Co-author)
- Diao, J. A.; Wu, G. J.; Taylor, H. A.; Tucker, J. K.; Powe, N. R.; Kohane, I. S.; Manrai, A. K. (12 January 2021). "Clinical Implications of Removing Race From Estimates of Kidney Function". JAMA. 325 (2): 184–186. doi:10.1001/jama.2020.22124. ISSN 1538-3598. PMC 7711563. PMID 33263721. (Co-author)
