= S. Lochlann Jain =

S. Lochlann Jain (also known as Lochlann Ross Jain) is a British/Canadian author and artist. He is currently a Professor in the Anthropology Department at Stanford University, where he teaches medical and legal anthropology. As of 2026, he is working on two book projects, the first of which examines pathogen transmissions between humans and animals with a focus on the hepatitis B vaccine. The second is a cultural history of drowning in prose and drawing.

== Education ==
Jain completed a BA at McGill University, an MPhil at the University of Glasgow, a PhD in the History of Consciousness Program at the University of California Santa Cruz, and a postdoctoral fellowship at the University of British Columbia.

== Books and research ==
Jain is the author of the book Injury, a political analysis of the history of injury law in the United States. Jain's second book, Malignant: How Cancer Becomes Us offers an analysis of cancer as an all-encompassing aspect of American culture and is considered to be a foundational text in cancer studies. It was described in Nature Magazine as being "brilliant and disturbing" and was widely reviewed. Jain developed the concept of "living in prognosis" to name and better understand the role of statistics in constituting the paradoxes of living with and in cancer. Malignant was awarded numerous prizes, including the Victor Turner Prize for Ethnographic Writing, The Staley Prize, The June Roth Prize for medical writing, the Edelstein Prize, the Diana Forsythe Prize. Jain's third book, Things that Art: A Graphic Menagerie of Enchanting Curiosity, deconstructs the work done by categories through a series of drawings and essays.

== Books ==
- Things That Art, University of Toronto Press, 2019.
- Malignant: How Cancer Becomes Us. University of California Press, 2013
- Injury: The Politics of Product Design and Safety Law in the United States, Princeton University Press. 2006
