= Ubach over Worms =

Former municipality in Limburg, the Netherlands

Coordinates: 50°55′N 6°03′E

Ubach over Worms (Dutch pronunciation: [ˈybɑx oːvər ˈʋɔr(ə)ms]) is a former municipality located in the southeast of the Netherlands, in the province of Limburg. In 1982 it was incorporated into the new municipality of Landgraaf along with Schaesberg and Nieuwenhagen. The German name for this part of Landgraaf is "Waubach". It is believed the latter name derives from Waldbach, which is German for "woodland creek", referring to the local Worm stream. This name is said to have later become corrupted to Waubach.

Ubach over Worms as a municipality dates back to 1795. It contained the five hamlets; Groenstraat, Rimburg, Waubach, Lauradorp and Abdissenbosch. After the French occupation the Kingdom of the Netherlands was formed and the Overworms area was separated from the German town Übach. They then chose the name Ubach over Worms, which means Ubach over Worms River, as seen from the German Übach.
