= The Body Multiple =

2002 book by Annemarie Mol

The Body Multiple: Ontology in Medical Practice
- Authors: Annemarie Mol
- Language: English
- Subjects: Anthropology
- Publisher: Duke University Press
- Publication date: 2002
- Publication place: USA
- Media type: Print (hardcover, paperback)
- Pages: 216
- Awards: Foundation for the Sociology of Health & Illness' Book of the Year Prize (2004); Fleck Prize (2004)
- ISBN: 978-0-8223-2917-6

The Body Multiple: Ontology in Medical Practice is a 2002 book by the anthropologist Annemarie Mol, published by Duke University Press. The book is an ethnographic study of atherosclerosis based on fieldwork in a Dutch university hospital. The book won the 2004 Foundation for the Sociology of Health & Illness' Book of the Year Prize at the British Sociological Association's Medical Sociology Group annual conference. The book was awarded the Fleck Prize in 2004. The book was met with praise upon publication, described as a "landmark in the STS literature", "a cornerstone in the canon of medical epistemology", and a "major contribution".

== Description ==
In the first line of the book, Mol states that "This is a book about the way in which (Western, allopathic) medicine deals with the body and its diseases". Mol explains that the book does not address "the ways in which medicine knows its objects" but instead "the way medicine enacts the objects of its concern and treatment".

Through the book, Mol gives attention to different practices through which atherosclerosis is diagnosed and managed. This includes examples in the pathology laboratory, in an operating theatre, and in an outpatient clinic. Mol provides detailed descriptions of how the condition is 'done'; a nurse listens to the patient's pulse, a surgeon views an x-ray, a pathologist examines a tissue, another surgeon cuts into a leg with their scalpel. Through her attention to these different ways of 'doing' atherosclerosis, Mol argues that these practices ultimately produce "what atherosclerosis is".

Lisa Blackman, writing in The Body: Key Concepts, summarises that Mol "uses the term or concept of the 'body multiple' to refer to the multiplication of objects that appear when we focus upon the practices that enact them".

== Research site and process ==
Mol writes that the book is "mostly situated in a university hospital in a medium-sized town in the center of the Netherlands". Mol uses a pseudonym to refer to the hospital, naming it Hospital Z. Mol spent two years at the hospital. Within the hospital, Mol describes observing technicians in the vascular laboratory, spending time in the hematologists' laboratory, following radiologists and pathologists, spending time in the library, observing surgery, and attending a weekly meeting where patients with complicated cases were discussed. Mol had conversations with, or interviewed, professionals including "epidemiologists, physiologists, internists, surgeons, and general practitioners". Mol engaged with texts written or relied upon by these doctors. Mol attended a monthly research colloquium about atherosclerosis. During her time at the hospital, Mol temporarily worked with a research assistant named Jeanette Pols who was a philosopher and psychologist. Pols conducted interviews with patients.

== Theoretical context ==
As a result of Bruno Latour's popularity in British sociology in the 1980s, attention to actor-network theory (ANT) grew among sociologists working on issues related to science, technology, and medicine. At the time The Body Multiple was published, Arun Saldanha wrote that "few books 'on' ANT" were then available. In this way, Saldanha viewed The Body Multiple as "very timely" as an intervention within the loose collection of works assembled under the ANT label that had until then not focussed so much on the human body. Saldanha framed The Body Multiple as reflecting a desire "to steer between social constructionism (which she calls 'perspectival tales') and objectivism or biological determinism". Saldanha wrote that through her effort to "bridge the gap between the 'human' and the 'natural' sciences'" in The Body Multiple, Mol "joins ranks with Isabelle Stengers, Gilles Deleuze and Sterres" - materialist philosophers.

Arthur W. Frank summarised that the two texts in the book "respectively demonstrate and argue for a shift from Parsons to Goffman, and Foucault, to Bruno Latour and Donna Haraway". The British anthropologist and sociologist Ronald Frankenberg said that The Body Multiple "enables you to see David Armstrong, Jim Clifford, Erving Goffman, Foucault, Haraway, Hahn, Robert Pool, Allan Young and of course, Strathern in a new light".

== Style and content ==
The book is written in an experimental structure. The five chapters after the Introduction are presented as two parallel texts. One text presents an ethnographic engagement with atherosclerosis and takes up two thirds of the page, while the lower third of the page features Mol's engagement with theory and research literature. The texts are distinct but synchronised, with the lower text reflecting developments in the upper text. Torben Elgaard Jensen and Brit Ross Winthereik wrote that this experimental structure enables Mol to have a format where she "practices what she preaches: objects need not be singularized to their function". In Elgaard Jensen and Ross Winthereik's view, the approach works well because of the texts' "partial connections and multiplicity".

=== Contents ===
The book is divided into a preface and six chapters. The titles of the chapters are as follows:

1. Doing Disease (pp.1-28)
2. Different Atheroscleroses (pp.29-52)
3. Coordination (pp.53-86)
4. Distribution (pp.87-118)
5. Inclusion (pp.119-150)
6. Doing Theory (pp.151-184)

== Reception ==
Writing in The American Journal of Sociology, Arthur W. Frank said: "The Body Multiple is my nominee for defining medical sociology in the 21st century". Frank summarised that Mol "follows objects, details enactments, reviews the literature, and her compelling, original view of society seems like it has been there all along, as it has". Frank concluded by labelling the book a "major contribution".

Torben Elgaard Jensen and Brit Ross Winthereik, in a review for Acta Sociologica, described the book as "eloquently written, theoretically innovative and empirically rich". Elgaard Jensen and Ross Winthereik said that the book represents "a vigorous exercise in praxiography" in addition to "an experiment in the structure and form of a scholarly text". They summarised the book as "an ambitious attempt to shift the grounds for thinking about what a medical object is". Elgaard Jensen and Ross Winthereik concluded that: "The novelty of its theoretical approach, the clarity of its writing, its clever structure and its rich account of practice make The Body Multiple nothing less than a landmark in the STS literature".

Arun Saldanha, in a review essay published in Critical Sociology, said: "I strongly recommend Mol's book not only for sociologists/anthropologists of medicine and illness, but for any social scientists interested in conceptualising social practice".

Hans Harbers, reviewing for Science, Technology, & Human Values, wrote that through the book Mol "meticulously unravels them and thus rejects any notion of a unified science". Harbers wrote that "The Body Multiple is self-reflexively so well wrought that it becomes almost unassailable". Harbers described The Body Multiple as "a remarkably rich book" and said that it had been " honored with the Ludwik Fleck Prize 2004 for very good reasons."

Dorothy H. Broom, in a review for The Australian Journal of Anthropology, said "I am still at a loss for a way to summarise and evaluate a book that explicitly disavows summary and evaluation." Broom described the book as "simultaneously an argument for and an example of how objects—including diseases—are fundamentally multiple." Broom praised the book for being "mercifully free of jargon and highly engaging".

In a review published in the Journal of the History of Medicine and Allied Sciences, Jacalyn Duffin described the book as "brilliant, wonderfully polyglot, insightful, humorous, and bold, almost but not quite to the point of outrageous." Duffin summarised that The Body Multiple is "an original “object”—a creation that deserves a prominent place as a cornerstone in the canon of medical epistemology".

Todd Meyers, writing in Medical Anthropology Quarterly, said: "However it is read, The Body Multiple is profoundly important. It is equally problematic". Meyers wrote that "The book is written in a style that is approachable, attention holding, and, at times, compelling and provocative" but "also frustrating, perhaps suffering from its own innovation." Meyers critiqued Mol's reading of Georges Canguilhem's work on pathology as being "very different" to Meyers' conception of Canguilhem. Meyers summarised that "Mol offers a sharp rendering of experience and knowledge in relation to illness and the production of medical science as the site of meaning."

Michael Parker, in a review published in BioSocieties, wrote that the book "raises the possibility of innovative approaches to the bringing of ethnographic and bioethics approaches to bear on ethics as an object" elaborating that "it seems to open up the possibility of a more productive and engaged relationship between ethics, social science and medical science and practice."

=== Awards ===
- Society for the Social Studies of Science Ludwick Fleck Prize (2004).
- Foundation for the Sociology of Health & Illness Book of the Year Prize (2004).

== Wider impact ==
Mol's framework, argument, and approach in the book has gone on to inspire other works in the social sciences. Examples include work on Indigenous ecologies and entangled worlds; the study of citizenship; the research of care; prenatal exercise and (in)activity; spiritual and aesthetic cultures; pregnancy; obesity surgery; and congenital adrenal hyperplasia.
