= Malignant: How Cancer Becomes Us =

- Author: S. Lochlann Jain
- Subject: cancer
- Publisher: University of California Press
- Publication date: 2013
- ISBN: 978-0-520-27657-4

Malignant: How Cancer Becomes Us is a 2013 book by S. Lochlann Jain, published by University of California Press. Jain writes about their experience with an advanced form of breast cancer at the age of 36.

== Summary ==
The book consists of nine chapters, in which each chapter talks about an important part of Jain's life with cancer. After being previously misdiagnosed three times, Jain discovers that they have an advanced form of breast cancer. They decide to treat their breast cancer by undergoing a double mastectomy, radiation, and chemotherapy. Throughout the recovery process of each course of treatment, Jain emotionally heals by joining recovery groups and researching the statistics and background of cancer, including attending oncology conferences. This leads them to question the medicine and culture behind cancer.

== Reception ==
The book was reviewed in the journals Literature and Medicine and Nature Medicine, as well as Kirkus Magazine and the Times Literary Supplement.

It won a number of prizes, including the Society for the History of Technology's 2014 Edelstein Prize, the Society of Humanistic Anthropology's 2014 Victor Turner Prize, the American Anthropological Association's 2014 Diana Forsythe Prize, the Society for Social Studies of Science's 2015 Ludwik Fleck Prize, and the 2016 J. I. Staley Prize.
