= Choice Outstanding Academic Titles =

Booklist run by the Association of College and Research Libraries

Choice Outstanding Academic Titles, formerly Outstanding Academic Books, is a booklist curated by editors working with Choice Reviews, a publishing unit of the Association of College and Research Libraries (ACRL). According to the American Library Association, the Outstanding Academic Titles list "reflects the best in scholarly titles... and brings with it the extraordinary recognition of the academic library community."

The list is published every December and covers around 10 percent of the roughly 5,000 books reviewed annually. According to the ACRL, Choice reaches 22,000 librarians and an estimated 13,000 higher education faculty in almost every undergraduate college and university library in the United States, along with many larger public libraries, and special and governmental libraries. In 2014, Choice partnered with EBSCOhost to highlight the academic books selected as Outstanding Academic Titles available on EBSCO, allowing "librarians to easily identify and acquire the titles that have been designated as excellent in presentation and scholarship, bringing exceptional support to the research of their students and faculty and increasing the value of their overall library collection. Although the list is commonly used, some researchers warn librarians against using curated lists such as this to populate their libraries.

== History ==
Until 2000, the list was referred to as Outstanding Academic Books; however, editors at Choice opted for a name change due to the increasing use of electronic products.

== Criteria ==
Reviews are published monthly in Choice magazine and Choice Reviews online. Choice publishes approximately 7,000 reviews per year in 50 subdisciplines spanning the humanities, science and technology, and the social and behavioral sciences. Selections for Outstanding Academic Titles are determined by scholars who act as experts in their respective fields of study and who do not receive payment for their reviews. Choice editors base their selections on the reviewer’s evaluation of the work, the editor’s knowledge of the field, and the reviewer’s record.

Books selected for the list must have been published within the 12 months prior to the list's release. When selecting books for the list, editors consider the following:

- "overall excellence in presentation and scholarship"
- "importance relative to other literature in the field"
- "distinction as a first treatment of a given subject in book or electronic form"
- "originality or uniqueness of treatment"
- "value to undergraduate students"
- "importance in building undergraduate library collections"
