= Schaesberg =

- Neighbourhood and former village
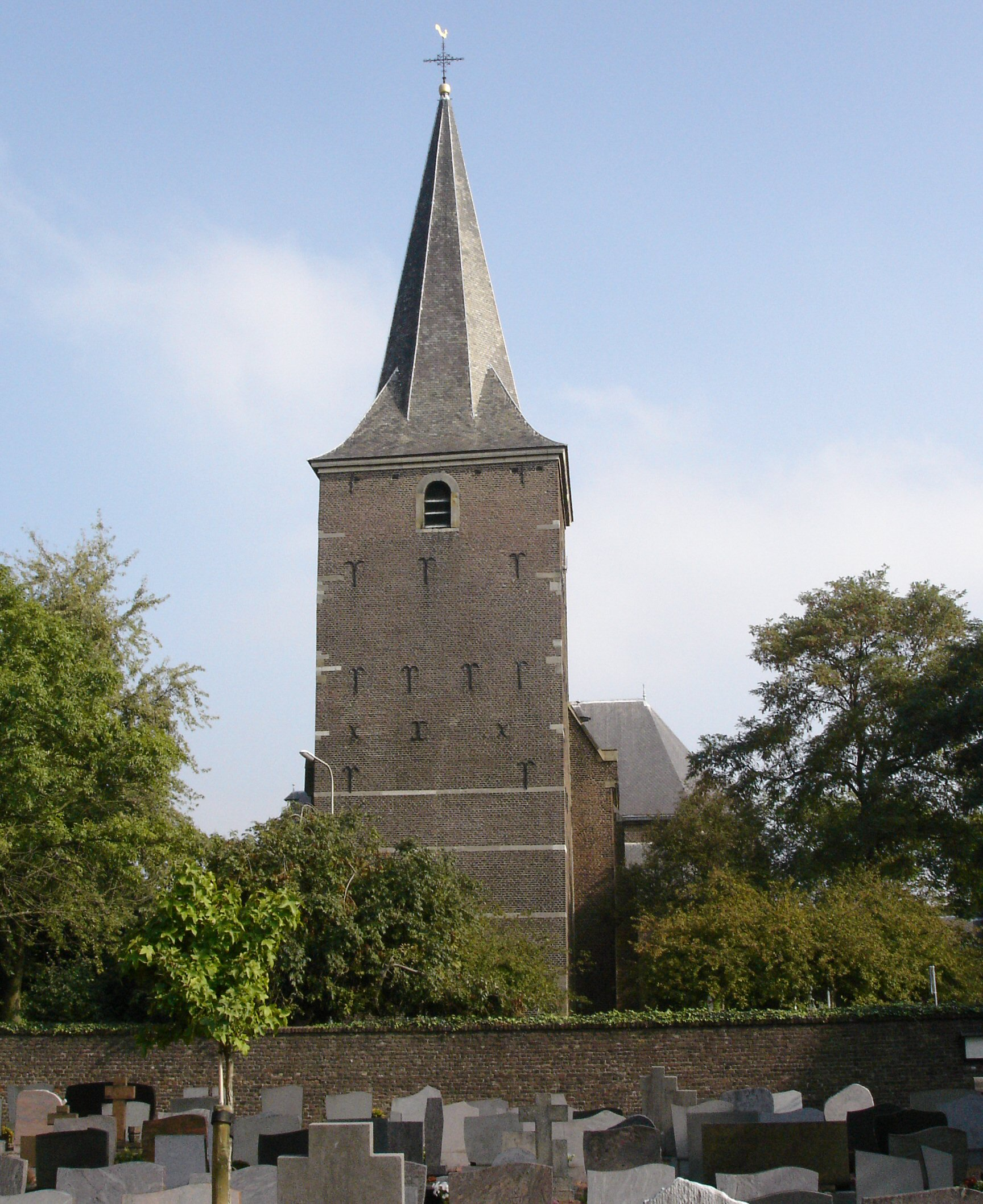
- Church of Saints Peter and Paul

- Location in the Netherlands Location in the province of Limburg in the Netherlands
- Coordinates: 50°54′N 6°01′E
- Country: Netherlands
- Province: Limburg (Netherlands)
- Municipality: Landgraaf

Area
  - Total: 8.71 km^{2} (3.36 sq mi)
- Elevation: 158 m (518 ft)

Population (2021)
  - Total: 15,900
  - Density: 1,830/km^{2} (4,730/sq mi)
- Time zone: UTC+1 (CET)
  - Summer (DST): UTC+2 (CEST)
- Postal code: 6371
- Dialing code: 045

Schaesberg (Dutch pronunciation: [ˈsxaːzbɛr(ə)x]; Limburgish: D'r Sjeet [dəʀ ˈʃeːt]) is a neighbourhood of Landgraaf and former village in the Dutch province of Limburg.

== History ==
The village was first mentioned in 16th century as Gaesberg. The etymology is unknown. Schaesberg developed in the 17th century between the Schaesberg and Strijthagen castles from the 13th century. In 1618, it became a heerlijkheid. In 1661, it became part of the Spanish Netherlands, and in 1713 an enclave of the Austrian Netherlands within the Dutch Republic. In 1785, it became part of the Dutch Republic.

The Catholic Peter and Paul Church was founded in 1648. In 1699, it was expanded and a tower was attached. Strijthagen Castle was built in 1530, but probably had a 13th century predecessor. It received its current form around 1700. Schaesberg castle was abandoned in 1733, and only ruins remain.

Schaesberg was home to 710 people in 1840. A railway station was built in 1896 on the Sittard to Herzogenrath (Germany) railway line. In 1949, a railway line to Simpelveld was added. The railway station was renamed Landgraaf in 1986, and the line to Simpelveld closed in 1988. In 1905, mine workers colonies were built in Schaesberg, and the village started to grow.

Schaesberg was a separate municipality until 1982, when it merged with Nieuwenhagen and Ubach over Worms to form the new municipality Landgraaf. It also became a neighbourhood of Landgraaf.

== Gallery ==
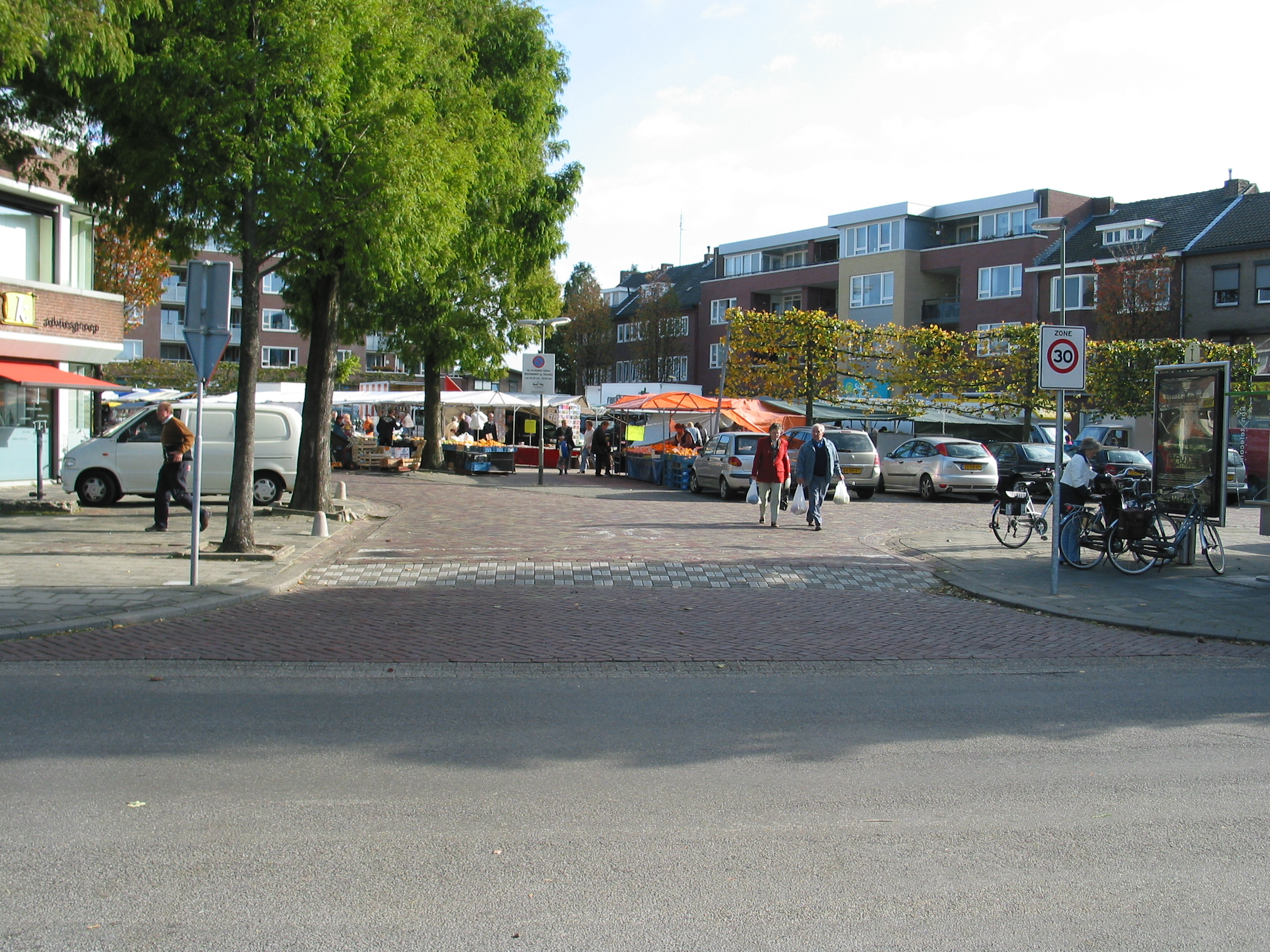
Market

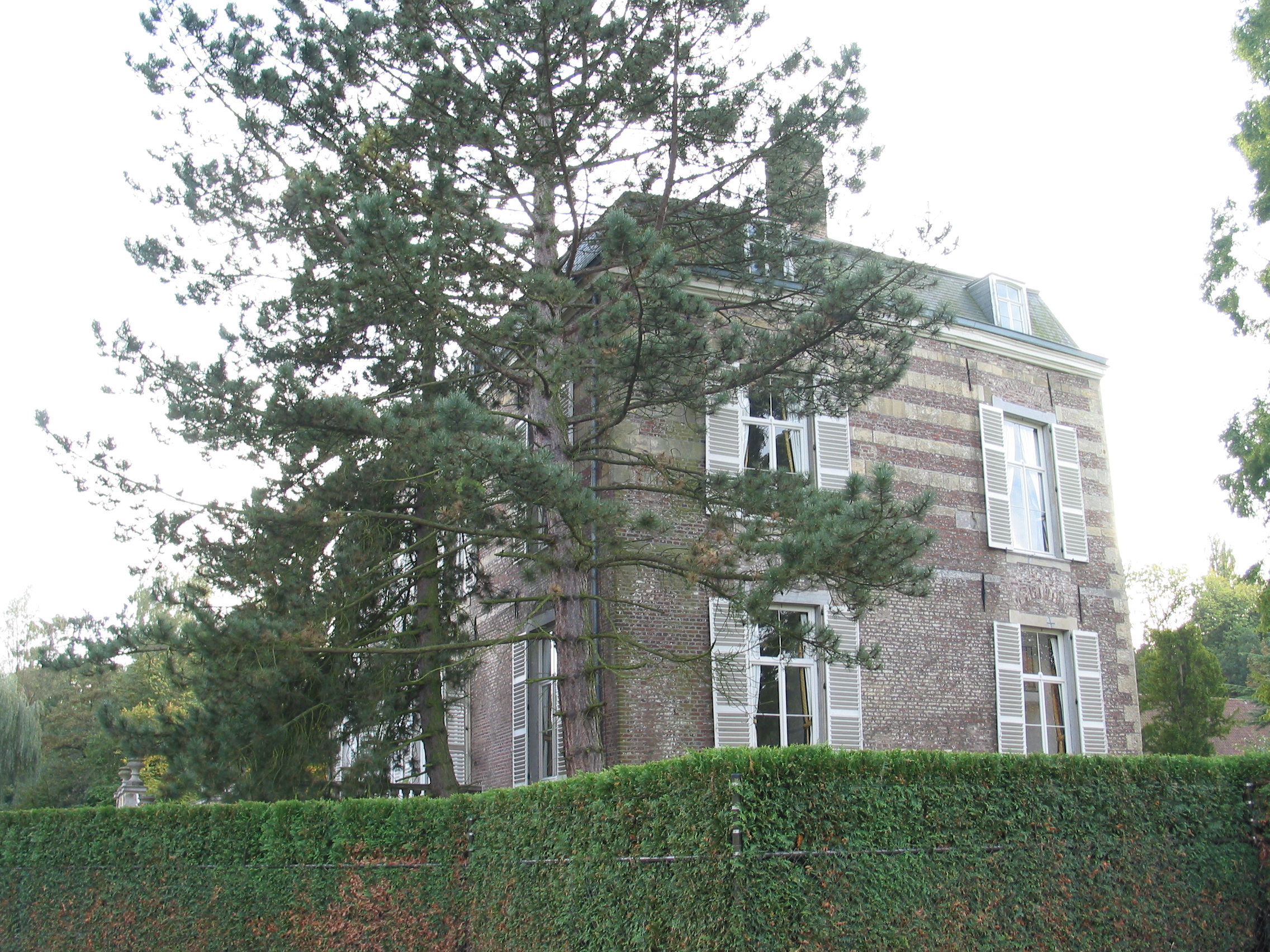
Strijthagen Castle

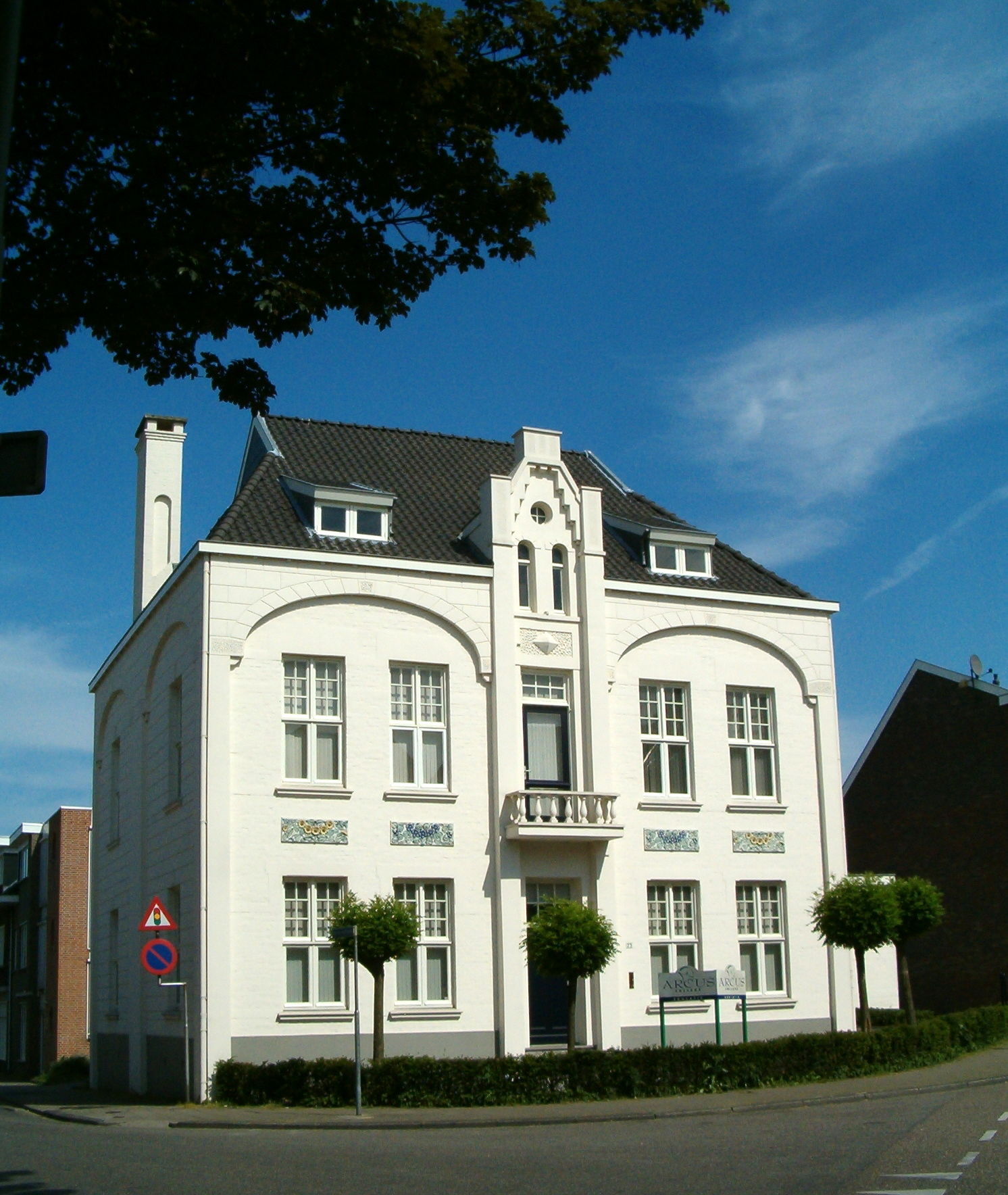
Villa in Schaesberg

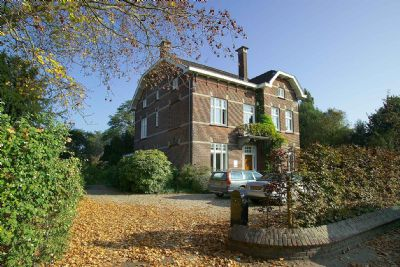
House in Schaesberg
