= Nieuwenhagen =

Nieuwenhagen Nujjenhage
- Village
- Interactive map of Nieuwenhagen
- Coordinates: 50°54′14″N 6°2′24″E
- Country: Netherlands
- Province: Limburg (Netherlands)
- Municipality: Landgraaf

Area
  - Total: 6.9 km^{2} (2.7 sq mi)

Population (2007)
  - Total: 9,400

Nieuwenhagen is a former village in the Dutch province of Limburg. It is now a part of the municipality of Landgraaf.

Nieuwenhagen was a separate municipality until 1982, when it became a part of Landgraaf.

== Notable natives ==
- Harry Kempen
- Joep Lange
