= Factual relativism =

Philosophical term

Factual relativism (also called epistemic relativism, epistemological relativism, alethic relativism, and cognitive relativism) is the philosophical belief that certain facts are not absolute but depend on the perspective from which they are being evaluated. It challenges the assumption that all facts are objective and universally valid. According to factual relativism, facts used to justify claims are shaped by social, cultural, or conceptual frameworks, making them subjective and relative.

== History and development ==
Factual relativism is rooted in the idea that the standards for what counts as a rational belief can change depending on cultural or conceptual perspectives. This challenges the traditional view that there are objective, universal standards for determining what is true and rational. The Ancient Greek philosopher Protagoras held that what is true almost always depends on other people's perspectives. For example, what might be a "bumpy" road to one person may be a "smooth" road to another person. However, this theory has been criticized for being essentially self-refuting; if anything is true based on one's perspective, then there would be very little notion of what it means for a statement to be false (falsifiability).

There are three main ideas behind factual relativism. The first is that the justification of beliefs depends on the context they are observed from. This challenges the idea of objectivity. The second is that there are many different perspectives and ways of thinking, some of which contradict each other. Lastly, factual relativism says that no perspective is superior to another.

During the Scientific Revolution, Galileo and Cardinal Robert Bellarmine disagreed about how planets move. Each used a different system. A relativist would argue that there is no fact of the matter about which view is supported by the evidence because there are no standards as to what evidence is true. In contrast, an anti-relativist would say one theory is better supported by evidence than the other.

Philosopher Thomas Kuhn influenced discussion of factual relativism with his idea of scientific paradigms. He argued that what scientists consider facts depends on the dominant paradigm they work within. These paradigms can shift drastically during periods of scientific revolutions, which suggests that scientific facts are not fixed but relative to the paradigm they arise from.

In anthropology, scholars like Peter Winch have explored how factual relativism plays out in non-Western cultures, such as the Azande people, whose belief in witchcraft is seen as rational within the context of their culture. This shows how factual relativism can help explain the legitimacy of different standards based on cultural context. This sparked debates about whether it is possible to compare beliefs across cultures using a single standard of rationality.

== Viewpoints ==
One perspective compares scientific knowledge to the mythology of other cultures, arguing that science is merely a societal set of myths based on societal assumptions. In Against Method, Paul Feyerabend writes, "The similarities between science and myth are indeed astonishing" and "First-world science is one science among many". But it is debated whether Feyerabend intended these statements to be taken entirely seriously, as they may have been a critique of the claimed objectivity of science rather than a full endorsement of the idea that science and myth are equally valid.

The strong program in the sociology of science, in the words of founder David Bloor, argues that it is "impartial with respect to truth and falsity". Elsewhere, Bloor and Barry Barnes have said "For the relativist [such as us] there is no sense attached to the idea that some standards or beliefs are really rational as distinct from merely locally accepted as such." In France, Bruno Latour has claimed that "Since the settlement of a controversy is the cause of Nature's representation, not the consequence, we can never use the outcome—Nature—to explain how and why a controversy has been settled."

Yves Winkin, a Belgian professor of communications, responded to a popular trial in which two witnesses gave contradicting testimony by telling the newspaper Le Soir that "There is no transcendent truth. [...] It is not surprising that these two people, representing two very different professional universes, should each set forth a different truth. Having said that, I think that, in this context of public responsibility, the commission can only proceed as it does."

The philosopher of science Gérard Fourez wrote, "What one generally calls a fact is an interpretation of a situation that no one, at least for the moment, wants to call into question."

British archaeologist Roger Anyon told The New York Times that "science is just one of many ways of knowing the world... The Zuni's world view is just as valid as the archeological viewpoint of what prehistory is about."

According to the Stanford Encyclopedia of Philosophy, "Relativism has been, in its various guises, both one of the most popular and most reviled philosophical doctrines of our time. Defenders see it as a harbinger of tolerance and the only ethical and epistemic stance worthy of the open-minded and tolerant. Detractors dismiss it for its alleged incoherence and uncritical intellectual permissiveness."

== Related views and criticism ==
=== Epistemic relativism ===
Epistemic relativism has many similarities to factual relativism: both question the objectivity of truth. According to epistemic relativism, knowledge depends on context and what counts as rational knowledge depends on one's perspective. This challenges the idea of objective standards for evaluating knowledge, just as factual relativism challenges the existence of objective facts. Critics such as Paul Boghossian argue that epistemic relativism can lead to epistemic incommensurability, where different knowledge systems are so distinct that there is no neutral way to compare or judge them.

=== The self-excepting fallacy ===
A primary critique of factual relativism is the self-excepting fallacy, introduced by Maurice Mandelbaum in 1962. According to this critique, the relativist view is inconsistent because it requires the relativist to accept a universal claim about the nature of facts, even though relativism itself denies the possibility of universal truth. Because of this contradiction, few authors in the philosophy of science accept cognitive relativism.

=== Philosophical perspectives on factual relativism ===
Larry Laudan's book Science and Relativism outlines various viewpoints on factual relativism in the form of a dialogue, presenting different perspectives on knowledge and how it relates to truth, objectivity, and cultural context.

=== Criticisms of cognitive relativism ===
Cognitive relativism has been criticized by both analytic philosophers and scientists. Critics argue that relativism's emphasis on knowledge's dependence on cultural and social contexts undermines the possibility of universal truth and objective knowledge. It can even be seen as a threat to scientific inquiry, as the scientific process depends on objective methods and standards of evidence.

== See also ==
- Aesthetic relativism
- Alternative facts
- Cultural relativism
- Moral relativism
