= Sharon Traweek =

American anthropologist

- Born: Sharon Jean Traweek

Academic background
- Education: University of California, Santa Cruz
- Thesis: Uptime, downtime, spacetime, and power: an ethnography of the particle physics community in Japan and the United States (1982)
- Influences: Robert O. Paxton, Vartan Gregorian, Hayden White and Gregory Bateson

Academic work
- Institutions: University of California, Los Angeles
- Main interests: Gender studies and history
- Notable works: Beamtimes and lifetimes: the world of high energy physicists

Sharon Jean Traweek is associate professor in the Department of Gender Studies and History at University of California, Los Angeles. Her book Beamtimes and Lifetimes: The World of High Energy Physicists, which explores the social world of particle physicists, has been cited in thousands of books and articles relating to the sociology of science and translated into Chinese in 2003.

== Career ==
In 1980, Traweek began teaching for the Stanford University Program in Values, Technology, Science, and Society. She was a professor in the MIT Program in Anthropology and Archeology as well as the Program in Science, Technology, and Society from 1982 to 1987. Afterward, she went to the Rice University Anthropology Department. She has been a professor at UCLA since 1994. She also held visiting faculty positions at the Mt Holyoke Five College Women's Studies Research Center, the Anthropology Department at the University of California, San Diego, the Program in Values, Technology, Science, and Society at Stanford University, and Sokendai, the Graduate University for Advanced Studies, in Japan. In 2020 Traweek was awarded (along with co-recipient Langdon Winner) the Society for the Social Studies of Science's Bernal Prize, awarded to "outstanding scholars who have devoted their careers to the understanding of the social dimensions of science and technology."

The modes of inquiry Traweek employs include collecting oral histories, conducting archival research, and performing ethnographic fieldwork. Her talks, given in over a dozen countries, span the fields of anthropology, cultural studies, history, information studies, Japan studies, science and technology studies, science education, and women's studies. The Danforth Foundation, the Fulbright Association, the Luce Foundation, the National Science Foundation, and the Japanese government are among the financial support for her work.

== Themes ==
A primary theme of Traweek's work is the crafting of knowledge by anthropologists, astronomers, historians, and physicists. She studies how communities of scholars make and transmit their knowledge, how they come to agreements or dispute each other, and how they gain professional standing and financial resources to do their work. Her research on astronomers and physicists has focused on large, distributed collaborations that circulate through a very few laboratories globally. By describing rhetorical and informal communication, such as physicists talk about their detectors, Traweek attends to the contextualization of discourse. Her work illustrates that knowledge practices occur not only in the mind, but also in embodied forms such as apparatus, symbolic representation, journals, institutions, habits of bodies, and routines of practice.

Her book, Beamtimes and Lifetimes, is an ethnographic study of disciplinary formation within a research community. It takes a broad ethnographic approach to studying physicists and laboratories by describing the lifetimes of members in the community, the ways of artifacts populate and impinge on the culture, descriptions of scientific practice, and the ethnographer's reflections on her own role as a researcher. In Beamtimes and Lifetimes, Traweek describes variations in the way physicists approach their work and the nature of knowledge in physics; for example, she compares how experimentalists and theorists relate to detectors and the results that are produced from them.

When experimentalists present papers at seminars and conferences, they always begin with a detailed description of their detector and devote at least a third of their talks to these machines before introducing the data generated in their experiments and reporting how those data were analyzed in order to produce "curves" (interpretations which have an acceptable degree of "fit" with the data). [...] It is the theorist who is more likely to see detectors as scientific instruments which simply record nature, as transcription devices which themselves leave no trace.

— Sharon Traweek, Beamtimes and Lifetimes: The World of High Energy Physicists

For experimentalists, particle detectors are proof of their skill as scientists; whereas theorists are more likely to minimize how the specifics of detectors shape the data or the scientific process.

Traweek includes voices not usually included in discussions of knowledge production in physics, such as women physicists in Japan or the trajectory of postdocs who are not hired to continue work in high energy physics after years of investment in the profession. One Japanese woman, Traweek describes, found ways to perform physics research without funding by acquiring data through her ties with a large multinational research group by asking for a dataset that was known to be interesting, but not the most desirable. She studies the ways physicists and astronomers worldwide learn to work together on addressing loss of funding or expansion in their research facilities. In the mid-1980s, the high energy physic facility in Japan, KEK, mushroomed because construction of TRISTAN (Transposable Ring Intersecting Storage Accelerator in Nippon) was completed. The lab director-general relayed to Traweek that it was named after Wagner's opera, “with the love and dreams for our science research.” Peopling Traweek's account of this expansion are the Japanese researchers who commuted back to Tokyo every weekend because they didn't want their children to go to local schools, the local man who navigated the bureaucracies of auto rental on behalf of foreign researchers, wives of Japanese researchers who wrote a visitors guide for foreigners, and graduate students from around Asia who didn't think they had developed long-term research relationships with the Japanese research professors. Looking at strategic uses of national, regional, class, & gender differences throughout her work, Traweek explores the ethics, aesthetics, and narrative strategies of physicists and their social environments.

Since 2009, Traweek has turned her attention to the ways digital data practices are changing and shaping scholarship, such as the development of new digital modes of scholarly communication and diverse styles of digital knowledge making. She studies new digital strategies to audit and evaluate scholarship, and then to allocate resources for scholarship.

== Criticism ==
Conventional science theorists find it controversial to include social structures of scientific practice as part of a conception of science. In contrast to Traweek and social constructionists who describe these cultural nuances, conventional theorists prefer to focus only on the cognitive content or “laws of nature”. Daphne Patai and Noretta Koertge criticized Traweek for a passage that calls attention to genital metaphor in the naming of scientific instruments at SLAC. Koertge states that this passage is Freudian and distracts readers from Traweek's serious work. Koertge suggests that the study of gender in science aims to undermines scientific discourse.

Sociologist David Bloor, a proponent of the "strong programme" in the sociology of scientific knowledge, criticized Traweek's work as providing "no detailed description of the content of the physicist's knowledge in her book" and for making "somewhat inflated claims for her data and the significance of her findings." Bloor's criticism echoed the earlier judgments of philosopher Bruno Latour, a leading practitioner of science and technology studies, who found that "in spite of her claim to 'thick description', Traweek is unable to relate the contents of physics to the social organization."

== Books ==
- Amara, Roy; Lipinski, Hubert; Spangler, Kathleen; Sharon Traweek (1978). Communication needs in computer modeling (Report). Menlo Park, California: Institute for the Future. Research Conducted for the Division of Mathematical and Computer Sciences, National Science Foundation. Published in Conference proceedings 1978 Winter Simulation Conference (WSC 1978). Pdf.
- Beamtimes and Lifetimes
- Reid, Roddey; Traweek, Sharon (2000). Doing Science + Culture. Psychology Press. ISBN 978-0-415-92112-1.
