= Motte-and-bailey fallacy =

Type of informal fallacy

The motte-and-bailey fallacy (named after the motte-and-bailey castle), also called the castle and courtyard, is a form of argument and an informal fallacy where an arguer conflates two positions that share similarities: one modest and easy to defend (the "motte") and one much more controversial and harder to defend (the "bailey"). The arguer advances the controversial position, but when challenged, insists that only the more modest position is being advanced. Upon retreating to the motte, the arguer may claim that the bailey has not been refuted (because the critic refused to attack the motte) or that the critic is unreasonable (by equating an attack on the bailey with an attack on the motte).

== History ==
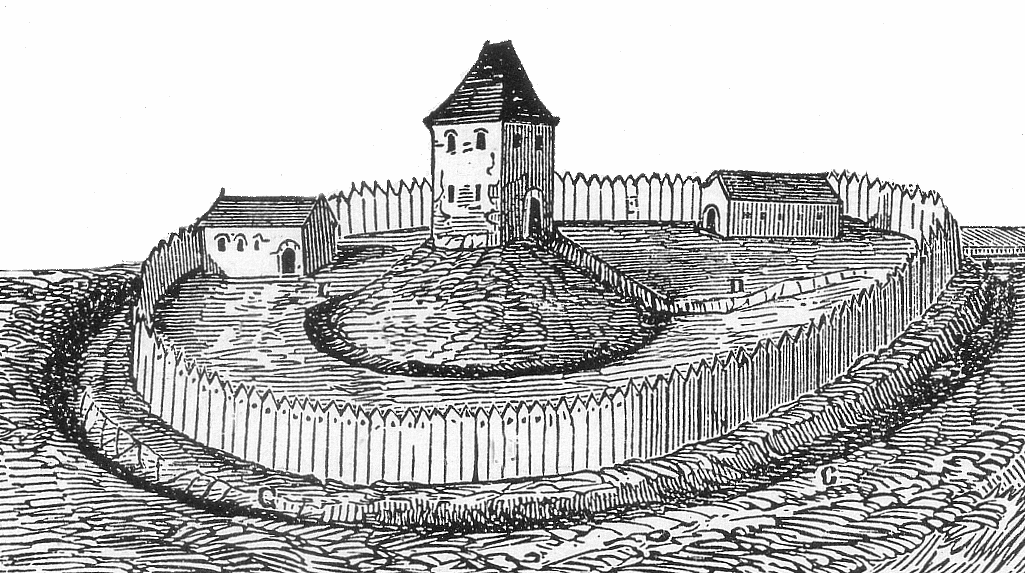
A motte and bailey castle. The motte is the hill with the fortified keep on top; the bailey is the larger, fenced area.

Philosopher Nicholas Shackel, who coined the term, prefers to speak of a motte-and-bailey doctrine instead of a fallacy. In 2005, Shackel described the reference to medieval castle defense like this:

A Motte and Bailey castle is a medieval system of defence in which a stone tower on a mound (the Motte) is surrounded by an area of land (the Bailey) which in turn is encompassed by some sort of a barrier such as a ditch. Being dark and dank, the Motte is not a habitation of choice. The only reason for its existence is the desirability of the Bailey, which the combination of the Motte and ditch makes relatively easy to retain despite attack by marauders. When only lightly pressed, the ditch makes small numbers of attackers easy to defeat as they struggle across it: when heavily pressed the ditch is not defensible and so neither is the Bailey. Rather one retreats to the insalubrious but defensible, perhaps impregnable, Motte. Eventually the marauders give up, when one is well placed to reoccupy desirable land.

[The Bailey] represents a philosophical doctrine or position with similar properties: desirable to its proponent but only lightly defensible. The Motte is the defensible but undesired position to which one retreats when hard pressed.

Shackel's original impetus was to criticize what he considered duplicitous processes of argumentation in works of academics such as Michel Foucault, David Bloor, Jean-Francois Lyotard, Richard Rorty, and Berger and Luckmann, and in postmodernist discourses in general.

The motte-and-bailey concept was popularized on the blog Slate Star Codex in 2014.

== Examples ==
An example given by Shackel is the statement "morality is socially constructed". In this example, the motte is that our beliefs about right and wrong are socially constructed, while the bailey is that there is no such thing as right and wrong.

According to Shackel, David Bloor's strong programme for the sociology of scientific knowledge made use of a motte-and-bailey doctrine when trying to defend his conception of knowledge as "whatever people take to be knowledge", without distinguishing between beliefs that are widely accepted but contrary to reality and beliefs that correspond to reality. In this instance, the easily defensible motte would be that what we call knowledge is what is commonly accepted as such, but the prized bailey would be that scientific knowledge is no different from other widely accepted beliefs, implying that truth and reality play no role in gaining scientific knowledge.

== Related concepts ==
The fallacy has been described as an instance of equivocation, more specifically concept-swapping, which is the substitution of one concept for another without the audience realizing.

In Shackel's original article, he argued that Michel Foucault employed "arbitrary redefinition" of elementary but inherently equivocal terms such as "truth" and "power" in order to create the illusion of "giving a profound but subtle analysis of a taken-for-granted concept". Shackel labeled this type of strategic rhetorical conflation of the broad colloquial understanding of a term with a technical, artificially stipulated one "Humpty Dumptying", in reference to an exchange in Through The Looking-Glass where that character says "When I use a word, it means just what I choose it to mean—neither more nor less."

In Shackel's description, a motte-and-bailey doctrine relies on overawing outsiders with pseudo-profundity, much like what Daniel Dennett called a deepity.

Unlike normal examples of equivocation where one exploits already existing, perhaps quite subtle, differences of meaning, Humpty Dumptying is hardly subtle. The differences in meaning are so obvious that equivocating by use of them cannot normally be pursued without first softening up the audience. The softening up is effected by convincing the audience that the dual meaning is somehow an exposition of a profundity. ... the strategy is, as in Foucault's "Truth and power", to first make use of the word in its redefined sense, then present the redefinition as if it had already been established as the deeper content of the concept. Finally, the impression of profundity is sealed by passages which elide both meanings at once.

== Critical analysis ==
Responding to Shackel's use of the motte-and-bailey concept, professor of rhetoric Randy Allen Harris objected to what he saw as the use of the concept to gratuitously violate the principle of charity by distorting other people's arguments and failing to understand the other's position beyond what is required to attack it; Harris criticized such usage of the motte-and-bailey concept for "avoiding a true fight" by portraying the other unfairly, which Harris called the "offensive corollary" of the other's retreat to the defensive motte. In other words, the person who attacks someone else for retreating to the motte could be "just as guilty" of retreating to a "siege engine" instead of engaging in a deeper dialogue with the other "out on the bailey". Harris pleaded for a rhetorical analysis that would explore disagreements more carefully and respectfully.

== See also ==
- Argumentation scheme – Type of argument
- Argumentation theory – Academic field of logic and rhetoric
- Bait-and-switch – Form of fraud
- Straw man – Form of incorrect argument and informal fallacy
- Cognitive bias – Systematic pattern of deviation from norm or rationality in judgment
- Intellectual virtue – Concept in Aristotelian ethics
- Media manipulation – Techniques in which partisans create an image that favours their interests
- Pooh-pooh – Fallacy in informal logic
- Sanewashing – Downplaying the radical aspects of a person or idea
- Tilting at windmills – English idiom
