= Edinburgh School (disambiguation) =

The term Edinburgh School describes two schools of cultural thought:

- The Edinburgh School, a group of artists
- Strong programme, or Edinburgh School, a group of sociologists
