= Beamtimes and Lifetimes =

1988 book by Sharon Traweek

Beamtimes and Lifetimes: The World of High Energy Physicists
- Editors: Sharon Traweek
- Subject: cultural anthropology
- Publisher: Harvard University Press
- Publication date: 1988
- ISBN: 978-0674063488

Beamtimes and Lifetimes: The World of High Energy Physicists is a book by Sharon Traweek on cultural anthropology and the sociology of science among people in the field of particle physics. It is an ethnography of high energy physicists that chronicles the laboratories, career paths, and values of a community of scientists based on her observations at SLAC National Accelerator Laboratory in California, US, and KEK High Energy Accelerator Research Organization in Japan.

Various reviewers profiled the book.

== Ethnography and sociology of science ==
Beamtimes and Lifetimes represents a turn of sociologists and anthropologists to use the tools of their discipline toward the powerful within modern culture rather than colonized cultures. It aims to broaden the understanding provided by philosophy and intellectual history which traditionally focused on the rational components of knowledge making. Anthropologists aim to enrich an understanding of science by presenting science as an activity embedded in culture, a domain rich in human practice and expression. In contrast to a view of science as a wholly rational pursuit, laboratory studies like Traweek's detail a process of constructing knowledge by situating it as products of local practices and cultural contingencies.

By illustrating strategies of individuals, groups, and institutions pursuing science goals, Traweek enriches an understanding of how science is practiced, extending beyond the laws of nature. Beamtimes and Lifetimes describes ways physicists create networks, the interpersonal connections through which preprints and informal communication are diffused, graduate students exchanged, and discussions about findings and goals are channeled. Creating these contacts and networks, that can then be tapped for opportunities, information, and support for ideas, is conceptualized by sociologists as a process of developing and leveraging social capital.

In Beamtimes and Lifetimes, Traweek aims to shed light on how high energy physicists create agreement and common understanding. She brings modes of knowledge-making sociologists call tacit knowledge, ideas and skills that are not explicitly articulated. Tacit knowledge, distinct from formal or codified knowledge such as that found in journals or textbooks, is gained primarily in collaboration with others and shared experience.

Traweek describes stories that American physicists tell with rhetorical flair about their own prowess in contrast to others. Humor is viewed by anthropologists as emblematic of cultural expression, because it captures play and otherwise unspoken attitudes, concepts, and values. Physicists engaged with Sharon's work about linguistic play between major labs or between experimentalists and theorists. An example she provided of a provocative suggestion that no one at Fermilab could "experimentally tie their shoes" and boast that at another lab they check the "tension in their shoelaces by hand every half hour" was responded to with banter from another physicist, in the form of a call for a workshop at Fermilab where there were "so many experts on topology, string tension, and all that".

== Values of high energy physicists ==
Traweek's description illustrates values held by high energy physicists, such as disregard for neatness as an indication of focusing on intellectual pursuits, or distaste for secret work as less prestigious by being more applied than basic research.

Secret work is distasteful to them because it is seen as applied research, in which ideas already established in basic or pure research are applied to less fundamental and challenging problems. They are proud of working at a lab where no classified work is conducted, because in their eyes basic research has much higher status.

Physicists’ concept of their work is saturated with the value they place on objectivity. Traweek concludes that particle physics is "an extreme culture of objectivity: a culture of no culture, which longs passionately for a world without loose ends, without temperament, gender, nationalism."

Traweek illustrates cultural performance of competition within various groups of physicists. Describing the transition of a student into a full-fledged member of the community, she points to a double-bind of unspoken expectations faced by a person holding a postdoc, a short-term research position after receiving a Ph.D. in the U.S. The "official description of group work as cooperative" is at odds with the status achieved amongst peers and group leaders trying to make a name for themselves selling ideas, illustrating the "disguised message that only competition and transgression will prevail." Since the majority of postdocs in high energy physics do not gain employment in the field, for individuals this is a high stakes process where they aren't told the keys to success. In the stories Traweek shares, senior physicists rationalize this competitive individualism as both just and effective in producing fine physics. American physicists "emphasize that science is not democratic: decisions about scientific purposes should not be made by majority rule within the community, nor should there be equal access to a lab's resources. On both these issues, most Japanese physicists assume the opposite."

Traweek's book enables a view into a culture with an ideology of meritocracy, a culture featuring values and norms characteristically white and masculine. Scholars have built on her work by researching ways to increase the retention of women and people of color in science. Cultural analysis of science includes considering the politics of the aesthetics held by physicists regarding their own knowledge and making practices. The perception of the beauty of a truth or the role of certain forms of humor expresses the particular and situated cultural activity of its community. When that community can make such claims as if they are universal, it illustrates the power of that community of knowers.

== High energy physics in Japan and US ==
Traweek's comparison of how high energy physics is conducted in KEK in Japan and SLAC in the US makes visible alternative values and social norms that might otherwise be taken for granted by studying one country. Comparing the physical environments and relations with surrounding communities, she notes that whereas the fence constructed around SLAC represents contention between the lab and the community fears about radiation safety, no fence was built around KEK. The researchers and employees of KEK reside in a social engineered science city in rural Japan, whereas SLAC is located near the existing hub of scientific and technological communities.

Because of the koza system of academic chairs, Japanese researchers function within lifelong work relationships in a vertical and non-competitive group structure having clear advancement trajectory, yet with little mobility from institution to institution as is practiced in the US. The stories about a life in physics told by Americans pivot on traits traditionally associated with men, such as independence in defining goals and fierce competition in a race for discoveries. Traweek contrasts that with an image in Japan of women as "not sufficiently schooled in the masculine virtues of interdependence, dependence, in the effective organization of teamwork and camaraderie, commitment to working in one team in order to complete a complex task successfully and consulting with group members in decision making, and the capacity to nurture the newer group members in developing these skills." Traweek notes that although the traits associated with leadership are contrasting, in both cultural instances, virtues leading to success are ascribed to men.

== Technoscience ==
Traweek describes ways that technology such as particle detectors, not as neutral objects, but as artifacts embedded within and reflective of the values and social systems of their creators. Donna Haraway points to Beamtimes and Lifetimes as a reconceptualization and reading of machine and organism as coded texts in such a way that it opens up technological determinism. Detectors and laboratory environment are key characters in the matrix of ideas, experiences, organizational structures, and histories providing a context in which scientists ask questions.

Traweek describes the detector of one research group as enabling a particular form of research because experimentalists could regularly tinker with it to rule out alternative explanations. This contrasts with a detector built at KEK, which was optimized for stability, due to expectations within funding frameworks that the detector be active for a long time and because relationships with the industrial companies providing components hamper ad hoc adjustments.

Drawing on Traweeks empirical work observing physicists, Karin Knorr Cetina suggests that laboratories are environments that illustrate "levels of sociality that are object-centered" and an embedding environment for a modern self "uprooted and disembedded" from the human bonds and traditions in previous contexts of belonging. Objects such as laboratories and detectors play significant roles in providing a context for a sense of self.
