= Empirical modelling (computer science) =

Computer modelling based on empirical observation

Empirical modelling refers to any kind of computer modelling based on empirical observations rather than on mathematically describable relationships of the system modelled.

== Empirical Modelling ==
=== Empirical Modelling as a variety of empirical modelling ===
Empirical modelling is a generic term for activities that create models by observation and experiment. Empirical Modelling (with the initial letters capitalised, and often abbreviated to EM) refers to a specific variety of empirical modelling in which models are constructed following particular principles. Though the extent to which these principles can be applied to model-building without computers is an interesting issue (to be revisited below), there are at least two good reasons to consider Empirical Modelling in the first instance as computer-based. Without doubt, computer technologies have had a transformative impact where the full exploitation of Empirical Modelling principles is concerned. What is more, the conception of Empirical Modelling has been closely associated with thinking about the role of the computer in model-building.

An empirical model operates on a simple semantic principle: the maker observes a close correspondence between the behaviour of the model and that of its referent. The crafting of this correspondence can be 'empirical' in a wide variety of senses: it may entail a trial-and-error process, may be based on computational approximation to analytic formulae, it may be derived as a black-box relation that affords no insight into 'why it works'.

Empirical Modelling is rooted on the key principle of William James's radical empiricism, which postulates that all knowing is rooted in connections that are given-in-experience. Empirical Modelling aspires to craft the correspondence between the model and its referent in such a way that its derivation can be traced to connections given-in-experience. Making connections in experience is an essentially individual human activity that requires skill and is highly context-dependent. Examples of such connections include: identifying familiar objects in the stream of thought, associating natural languages words with objects to which they refer, and subliminally interpreting the rows and columns of a spreadsheet as exam results of particular students in particular subjects.

=== Principles ===
In Empirical Modelling, the process of construction is an incremental one in which the intermediate products are artefacts that evoke aspects of the intended (and sometimes emerging) referent through live interaction and observation. The connections evoked in this way have distinctive qualities: they are of their essence personal and experiential in character and are provisional in so far as they may be undermined, refined and reinforced as the model builder's experience and understanding of the referent develops. Following a precedent established by David Gooding in his account of the role that artefacts played in Michael Faraday's experimental investigation of electromagnetism, the intermediate products of the Empirical Modelling process are described as 'construals'. Gooding's account is a powerful illustration of how making construals can support the sense-making activities that lead to conceptual insights (cf. the contribution that Faraday's work made to electromagnetic theory) and to practical products (cf. Faraday's invention of the electric motor).

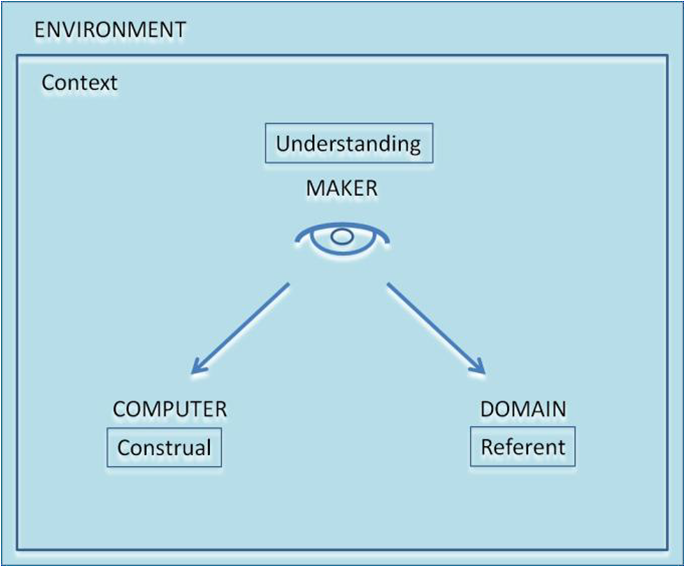
Figure 1 Making a construal

The activities associated with making a construal in the Empirical Modelling framework are depicted in Figure 1.

The eye icon at the centre the figure represents the maker's observation of the current state of development of the construal and its referent. The two arrows emanating from the eye represent the connection given-in-experience between the construal and its referent that is established in the mind of the maker. This connection is crafted through experimental interaction with the construal under construction and its emerging referent. As in genuine experiment, the scope of the interactions that can be entertained by the maker is inconceivably broad. At the maker's discretion, the interactions that characterise the construal are those that respect the connection given in the maker's experience. As the Empirical Modelling process unfolds, the construal, the referent, the maker's understanding and the context for the maker's engagement co-evolve in such a way that:

- the interactive experience that the construal affords is enhanced;
- the interactive experience that characterises the referent is refined;
- the repertoire of characteristic interactions with the construal and its referent is enlarged;
- the contextual constraints on characteristic interactions with the construal and its referent are identified.

=== Empirical Modelling concepts ===
In Empirical Modelling. making and maintaining the connection given-in-experience between the construal and referent is based on three primary concepts: observables, dependencies and agency. Within both the construal and its referent, the maker identifies observables as entities that can take on a range of different values, and whose current values determine its current state. All state-changing interactions with the construal and referent are conceived as changes to the values of observables. A change to the value of one observable may be directly attributable to a change in the value of another observable, in which case these values are linked by a dependency. Changes to observable values are attributed to agents, amongst which the most important is the maker of the construal. When changes to observable values are observed to occur simultaneously, this can be construed as concurrent action on the part of different agents, or as concomitant changes to observables derived from a single agent action via dependencies. To craft the connection given-in-experience between the construal and referent, the maker constructs the construal in such a way that its observables, dependencies and agency correspond closely to those that are observed in the referent. To this end, the maker must conceive appropriate ways in which observables and agent actions in the referent can be given suitable experiential counterparts in the construal.

The semantic framework shown in Figure 1 resembles that adopted in working with spreadsheets, where the state that is currently displayed in the grid is meaningful only when experienced in conjunction with an external referent. In this setting, the cells serve as observables, their definitions specify the dependencies, and agency is enacted by changing the values or the definitions of cells. In making a construal, the maker explores the roles of each relevant agent by projecting agency upon it as if it were a human agent and identifying observables and dependencies from that perspective. By automating agency, construals can then be used to specify behaviours in much the same way that behaviours can be expressed using macros in conjunction with spreadsheets. In this way, animated construals can emulate program-like behaviours in which the intermediate states are meaningful and live to auditing by the maker.

=== Environments to support Empirical Modelling ===
The development of computer environments for making construals has been an ongoing subject of research over the last thirty years. The many variants of such environments that have been implemented are based on common principles. The network of dependencies that currently connect observables is recorded as a family of definitions. Semantically such definitions resemble the definitions of spreadsheet cells, whereby changes to the values of observables on the right hand side propagate so as to change the value of the observable on the LHS in a conceptually indivisible manner. The dependencies in these networks are acyclic but are also reconfigurable: redefining an observable may introduce a new definition that alters the dependency structure. Observables built into the environment include scalars, geometric and screen display elements: these can be elaborated using multi-level list structures. A dependency is typically represented by a definition which uses a relatively simple functional expression to relate the value of an observable to the values of other observables. Such functions have typically been expressed in fragments of simple procedural code, but the most recent variants of environments of making construals also enable dependency relations to be expressed by suitably contextualised families of definitions. The maker can interact with a construal through redefining existing observables or introducing new observables in an open-ended unconstrained manner. Such interaction has a crucial role in the experimental activity that informs the incremental development of the construal. Triggered actions can be introduced to automate state-change: these perform redefinitions in response to specified changes in the values of observables.

=== Empirical Modelling as a broader view of computing ===
In Figure 1, identifying 'the computer' as the medium in which the construal is created is potentially misleading. The term COMPUTER is not merely a reference to a powerful computational device. In making construals, the primary emphasis is on the rich potential scope for interaction and perceptualisation that the computer enables when used in conjunction with other technologies and devices. The primary motivation for developing Empirical Modelling is to give a satisfactory account of computing that integrates these two complementary roles of the computer. The principles by which James and Dewey sought to reconcile perspectives on agency informed by logic and experience play a crucial role in achieving this integration.

The dual role for the computer implicit in Figure 1 is widely relevant to contemporary computing applications. On this basis, Empirical Modelling can be viewed as providing a foundation for a broader view of computing. This perspective is reflected in numerous Empirical Modelling publications on topics such as educational technology, computer-aided design and software development. Making construals has also been proposed as a suitable technique to support constructionism, as conceived by Seymour Papert, and to meet the guarantees for 'construction' as identified by Bruno Latour.

=== Empirical Modelling as generic sense-making? ===
The Turing machine provides the theoretical foundation for the role of the computer as a computational device: it can be regarded as modelling 'a mind following rules'. The practical applications of Empirical Modelling to date suggest that making construals is well-suited to supporting the supplementary role the computer can play in orchestrating rich experience. In particular, in keeping with the pragmatic philosophical stance of James and Dewey, making construals can fulfill an explanatory role by offering contingent explanations for human experience in contexts where computational rules cannot be invoked. In this respect, making construals may be regarded as modelling 'a mind making sense of a situation'.

In the same way that the Turing machine is a conceptual tool for understanding the nature of algorithms whose value is independent of the existence of the computer, Empirical Modelling principles and concepts may have generic relevance as a framework for thinking about sense-making without specific reference to the use of a computer. The contribution that William James's analysis of human experience makes to the concept of Empirical Modelling may be seen as evidence for this. By this token, Empirical Modelling principles may be an appropriate way to analyse varieties of empirical modelling that are not computer-based. For instance, it is plausible that the analysis in terms of observables, dependencies and agency that applies to interaction with electronic spreadsheets would also be appropriate for the manual spreadsheets that predated them.

=== Background ===
Empirical Modelling has been pioneered since the early 1980s by Meurig Beynon and the Empirical Modelling Research Group in Computer Science at the University of Warwick.

The term 'Empirical Modelling' (EM) has been adopted for this work since about 1995 to reflect the experiential basis of the modelling process in observation and experiment. Special purpose software supporting the central concepts of observable, dependency and agency has been under continuous development (mainly led by research students) since the late 1980s.

The principles and tools of EM have been used and developed by many hundreds of students within coursework, project work, and research theses. The undergraduate and MSc module 'Introduction to Empirical Modelling' was taught for many years up to 2013-14 until the retirement of Meurig Beynon and Steve Russ (authors of this article). There is a large website [1] containing research and teaching material with an extensive collection of refereed publications and conference proceedings.

The term 'construal' has been used since the early 2000s for the artefacts, or models, made with EM tools. The term has been adapted from its use by David Gooding in the book 'Experiment and the Making of Meaning' (1990) to describe the emerging, provisional ideas that formed in Faraday's mind, and were recorded in his notebooks, as he investigated electromagnetism, and made the first electric motors, in the 1800s.

The main practical activity associated with EM - that of 'making construals' - was the subject of an Erasmus+ Project CONSTRUIT! (2014-2017)[2].

== See also ==
- Multi-agent system
