= Geoffrey Cantor =

Geoffrey Cantor may refer to:

- Geoffrey Cantor (academic)
- Geoffrey Cantor (actor)
