= Steven Shapin =

American historian and sociologist of science (born 1943)

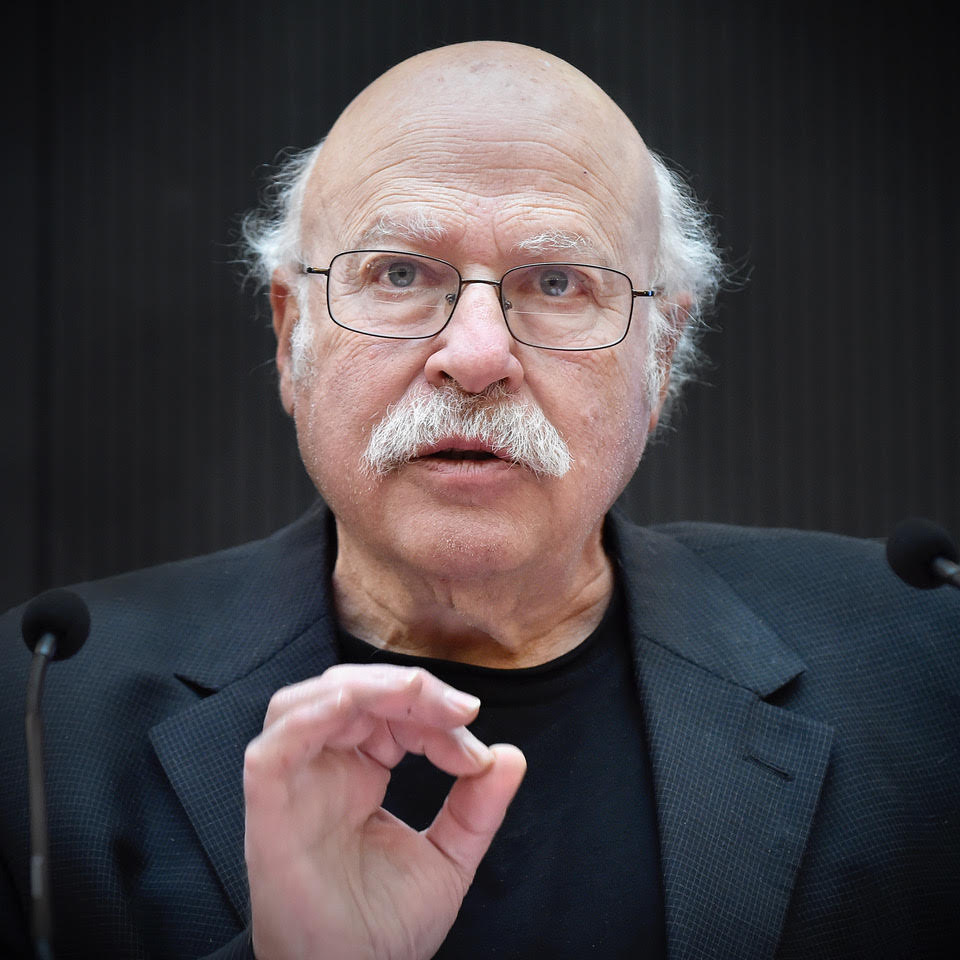
- Steven Shapin, speaking in Groningen, The Netherlands, March 2020
- Born: 1943 (age 82–83); New York, New York, U.S.
- Education: Reed College (B.A., 1966); University of Pennsylvania (PhD, 1971)

Steven Shapin (/ˈʃeɪpɪn/ SHAY-pin) (born 1943) is an American historian and sociologist of science. He is Professor Emeritus of the History of Science at Harvard University.

== Early life and education ==
Steven Shapin (born 1943 in New York) was educated at Central High School (Philadelphia) and at Reed College (Portland, Oregon), where he studied biology. He did graduate work in genetics at the University of Wisconsin before taking his Ph.D. in the history and sociology of science at the University of Pennsylvania in 1971.

== Employment ==
After a postdoctoral year at Keele University (England), Shapin was, from 1972 to 1989, Lecturer (later Reader) at the Science Studies Unit, University of Edinburgh. From 1989 to 2003, he was Professor of Sociology and a member of the Science Studies Program at the University of California, San Diego, and, from 2003 to 2014, he was Franklin L. Ford Professor of the History of Science at Harvard University, retiring as Emeritus Professor in 2014. He also held brief visiting appointments at Columbia University, Tel-Aviv University, the University of Pennsylvania, the University of Sydney, the School of Advanced Studies at the University of London, and he has offered several short courses at the University of Gastronomic Sciences (Pollenzo, Italy).

== Research interests ==
Shapin's early research dealt with institutional aspects of science in Scotland and England during the period of the Industrial Revolution and with the career of phrenology in connection with the social and political cleavages of early nineteenth-century Britain. From the early 1980s, he turned to questions concerning the Scientific Revolution and the conduct of experimental and observational science in the early modern period, and, from the early 2000s, he wrote about the nature of industrial and entrepreneurial science in modern America. More recently, Shapin has written about the history of food, taste, and the practices of subjectivity. While he was at the Edinburgh Science Studies Unit, Shapin was involved—with his colleagues the sociologist Barry Barnes and the philosopher David Bloor—in developing frameworks for the sociology of scientific knowledge and its application to concrete historical studies.

== Writing for general audiences ==
Shapin has written over 50 extended essays for the London Review of Books—on science, medicine, technology, philosophy, biography, food, and taste—and he is a Contributing Editor of that paper. He has also published essays in The New Yorker, Harper's Magazine, and other general-interest outlets.

Shapin's compact book on The Scientific Revolution, intended for a general readership, has been translated into 18 languages.

"there is inevitably something of "us" in the stories we tell about the past. This is the historian's predicament, and it is foolish to think there is some method, however well intentioned, that can extricate us from this predicament."

== Honors and awards ==
Shapin was awarded a fellowship from the John Simon Guggenheim Foundation and has spent a fellowship year at the Center for Advanced Study in the Behavioral Sciences in Palo Alto, California. He has won the Derek Price Prize of the History of Science Society (for the best paper published in the journal Isis), the Dingle Prize of the British Society for the History of Science for the Best Book Bringing History of Science before a Wide Audience (for The Scientific Revolution), the Ludwik Fleck Prize of the Society for Social Studies of Science for the Best Book (for A Social History of Truth), the Robert K. Merton Prize of the American Sociological Association for Best Book in Sociology of Science (also for A Social History of Truth), the J. D. Bernal Prize (for distinguished career achievement) of the Society for Social Studies of Science. He has given the Distinguished Lectureship of the History of Science Society, was awarded that Society's Sarton Medal (in recognition of “lifetime scholarly achievement”), and, with Simon Schaffer, won the Erasmus Prize of the Praemium Erasmianum Foundation (The Netherlands) for 2005, for “exceptionally important contributions to European culture, society or social science.” He is a member of the American Academy of Arts & Sciences.

== Selected bibliography ==
- Leviathan and the Air-Pump: Hobbes, Boyle, and the Experimental Life (Princeton, NJ: Princeton University Press, 1985; new edition 2011), with Simon Schaffer.
- A Social History of Truth: Civility and Science in Seventeenth-Century England (Chicago: University of Chicago Press, 1994).
- The Scientific Revolution (Chicago: University of Chicago Press, 1996; 2nd edition, with new Bibliographic Essay, 2018).
- Science Incarnate: Historical Embodiments of Natural Knowledge, edited with Christopher Lawrence (Chicago: University of Chicago Press, 1998).
- The Scientific Life: A Moral History of a Late Modern Vocation (Chicago: University of Chicago Press, 2008).
- Never Pure: Historical Studies of Science as if It Was Made by People with Bodies, Situated in Space, Time, and Society, and Struggling for Credibility and Authority (Baltimore, MD: The Johns Hopkins University Press, 2010.
- Eating and Being: A History of Ideas about Our Food and Ourselves (Chicago: University of Chicago Press, 2024).
