= Light Fantastic (TV series) =

- Title screen for Light Fantastic series.
- Genre: Documentary
- Directed by: Jeremy Turner; Annabel Gillings; Nick Davidson; Paul Sen
- Presented by: Simon Schaffer
- Starring: Dimitri Andreas; Edmund Dehn; Daniel Gosling; Mark Hyde; Clive Shilson
- Composer: Ty Unwin
- Country of origin: United Kingdom
- Original language: English
- No. of series: 1
- No. of episodes: 4

Production
- Executive producer: Anne Laking
- Producer: Paul Sen
- Running time: 50 minutes

Original release
- Network: BBC Four
- Release: 1 December – 22 December 2004

Light Fantastic is the title of a television documentary series that explores the phenomenon of light and aired in December 2004 on BBC Four. The series comprised four programmes respectively titled: "Let There Be Light"; "The Light of Reason"; "The Stuff of Light"; and "Light, the Universe and Everything." The material was presented by Cambridge academic Simon Schaffer.

== Let There Be Light ==
The first episode shows how the desire, by Greek, Arab and Christian scholars to penetrate the divine nature of light led to modern science's origins. The programme explores the contributions of Empedocles; Euclid; Al Hazen; Roger Bacon; Descartes and Isaac Newton.

=== Greek scholars ===
The nature of light, and how we see, was first investigated by the early Greek philosophers. Light seemed to fill all space while allowing a kind of penetration of the world thus offering a clue to the structure of the whole universe. The world was bathed in light but, to bring it within the world of reason, it was necessary to abstract and choose phenomena where light behaved in a special or strange way: Why do faraway objects appear smaller and why do objects change their position and shape when placed underwater?

Empedocles' idea, that we see objects because light streams out of our eyes and touches them, became the fundamental basis on which mathematicians would construct some of the most important theories on light and vision. Euclid's Optics expanded this idea to make an important breakthrough: We know in our minds that a faraway building is bigger, yet it is possible to position a finger such that our eye tells us they are of similar size. Euclid's elegant solution was that the eye and both the tops of finger and building must lie on the same line – thus the rays from the eye must follow straight lines; the new discipline of geometry could thus make predictions and solve problems of light and optics.

=== Al Hazen ===
Al Hazen earned a living selling his copies of Euclid's Geometry before obtaining the patronage of Al Hakim, 6th Fatimid Caliph in Cairo. Al Hazen was unable to fulfill his task of stopping the flooding of the Nile and was imprisoned. Here he noted a problem with Empedocles's theory: having been in darkness and then suddenly exposed to light, his eyes felt intense pain. It seemed improbable that, if rays were indeed emitted by the eye, this would happen; instead Al Hazen postulated that light rays travelled through space in straight lines and entered our eyes by bouncing off objects. He studied refraction and the symmetry of reflection, producing a seven-volume work which became the new standard text.

=== Christian science ===
In the centuries following Al Hazen's death, the Catholic Church determined to demonstrate its Divine authority and produce a "Christian" knowledge of light. The translation of the work of the Islamic scholars allowed Roger Bacon, in the 13thC, to study and develop Al Hazen's work through experimentation with the distortion and colour effects of light through glass and water.

== The Light of Reason ==
The second episode explores the link between the development of practical tools that manipulate light and the emergence of new ideas. The subject is examined through the work of Tycho Brahe; Galileo; Vermeer; Robert Hooke; William Herschel; Ole Rømer; Charles Darwin and Ernest Rutherford.

Brahe was granted the island of Hven by Denmark's Frederick II. From here he observed a comet in 1577. Tycho's measurements proved it was further away than supposed thus challenging the Church's traditional view that God had created the Earth at the centre of the Universe.

== The Stuff of Light ==
The third episode charts the discovery of the true nature of light and the subsequent development of modern technology such as electricity and mobile phones. The pioneers are credited as James Clerk Maxwell; Joseph Swan; William Armstrong; Thomas Edison; Wilhelm Röntgen; J. J. Thomson; and Max Planck.

In 1847, as a sixteen-year-old, Maxwell was taken to see one of the minor scientific wonders of the Victorian world: a prism made from a special Icelandic crystal.

== Light, the Universe and Everything ==
The final episode explores the relationship between light, the eye and the mind and the development of technologies such as photography and cinema. The achievements of John Dalton; Benjamin Thompson; Thomas Young; Lord Rayleigh; Joseph Priestley; Thomas Wedgwood; Eadweard Muybridge; Étienne-Jules Marey and Albert Einstein are discussed.

From their knowledge of colour blindness, some Victorian scientists believed they could prove the perceived cultural supremacy of the English by measuring differences of colour perception in different races. The idea was that animals were lower down the evolutionary scale but had better attuned senses than humans. If it could be proved that black people had better responses to light and colour this would be evidence of their inferiority. In 1898 William Rivers, together with a group of Cambridge academics, set off for the Torres Straits to prove exactly this. Rivers used a tintometer but found his original hypothesis was false and that the range of "colour difference perception" of the islanders was little different from that of the English. When Rivers returned to England he spearheaded dissemination of the fact that there was no scientific evidence to support white supremacy.

The programme continues and describes Priestley's discovery of photosynthesis.

== DVD release ==
The series was released as a region 2 DVD in 2014 .
