= Sociology of scientific ignorance =

Study of ignorance in science

The sociology of scientific ignorance (SSI) is the study of ignorance in and of science. The most common way is to see ignorance as something relevant, rather than simply lack of knowledge. There are two distinct areas in which SSI is being studied: some focus on ignorance in scientific research, whereas others focus on public ignorance of science. Sociology of scientific ignorance is a complementary field to the sociology of scientific knowledge (SSK).

When studying ignorance in scientific research, the common standpoint is that ignorance can be used as a tool in science. An example of this is blackboxing, which is the notion that it can be beneficial to hide the internal parts of a system, and only make the input and output visible to the user.

Studies of public ignorance of science focuses on how scientific ignorance can affect society, the public view of science, and what can give rise to public ignorance of science. This area is related to public understanding of science.

== Ignorance in scientific research ==
Generally, the word ignorance has a negative tone to it, and for a long time scientific ignorance was viewed as a purely negative thing. Recently, however, people have started to abandon this idea, and instead try to find uses of deliberate ignorance. This has generally been called useful ignorance. A first step in finding uses of ignorance is realizing that ignorance is inevitable. As Matthias Gross says: "new knowledge also means more ignorance". Gross also talks about the connection between ignorance and surprise. Surprise can reveal what scientists are ignorant of, which help them focus their research in order to gain knowledge. On the other hand, ignorance is what gives rise to surprise, making the two very connected.

=== Ignorance mobilization ===
In correspondence with knowledge mobilization, which refers to moving available knowledge into use, a concept of ignorance mobilization has been introduced. "Ignorance mobilization can be understood as the use of ignorance towards the achievement of goals." This concept also makes a distinction between two types of ignorance: active non-knowledge is ignorance that is intentionally or unintentionally taken into account within science; latent non-knowledge is ignorance that is not taken into account. The latter more resembles the old view of ignorance, as lack of knowledge. Ignorance mobilization can be said to aim to change latent non-knowledge into active non-knowledge, thereby making it useful for further research.

=== Specified ignorance ===
Specified ignorance is the notion of non-knowledge that the scientists are aware of, and must change into knowledge in order to gain knowledge of something else. "The express recognition of what is not yet known but needs to be known in order to lay the foundation for still more knowledge". This can help scientist direct their research, in that it shows what pre-studies needs to be done, before doing the main research.

== Public ignorance of science ==
This division of SSI is generally looking at the causes of public ignorance of science, as well as the impact it can have on scientific research and society. One way of categorizing the causes of ignorance uses the following three categories:

- Deliberate choice, due to not being interested.
- Division of labour, meaning that it's not relevant to one's job.
- Mental constitution, that is having a non-scientific mind.

Studies have also been done that focus heavily on the role journalists – and media in general – play when it comes to public ignorance of science and common scientific misconceptions. The reason behind journalists spreading false or misleading information can be either because the journalists believe the information to be true, or because of some personal gain for the journalist. A common way to put weight to the journalists' claims is to point to a scientific controversy, or to ignorance within scientific research. Although the latter is unavoidable, by the common view in SSI, this has made scientists more hesitant to discuss their ignorance, since this could be used by media to diminish their work. One area where media is said to have played a prominent role in the public opinion of the matter is that of the global warming controversy.

== See also ==
- Agnotology
- Antiscience
- Black box
- Philosophy of social science
- Public awareness of science
- Science, technology and society
- Science studies
- Sociology of knowledge
- Sociology of scientific knowledge
