= S. Barry Barnes =

British sociologist

S. Barry Barnes (born 27 March 1943) was Professor of Sociology at the University of Exeter.

Barnes worked at the 'Science Studies Unit' at the University of Edinburgh with David Bloor from the 1970s through the early 1990s, where they developed the strong programme in the Sociology of Scientific Knowledge. He moved to the sociology department in Exeter in 1992. Barnes is known for his naturalistic approach to science, a view elaborated in his book Scientific Knowledge and Sociological Theory (1974). He advocated a post-Kuhnian approach to scientific knowledge, and suggested that philosophers, historians and other researchers study scientific practice in a variety of fields as cultural traditions whose development could be given causal explanations. In this view conceptual change in normal science is a process unfolding through expert debate and negotiation. This latter perspective was developed in T. S. Kuhn and Social Science (1982).

== Main works ==
- Scientific Knowledge and Sociological Theory, London; Boston : Routledge and K. Paul, 1974. ISBN 978-0415474375
- Interests and the growth of knowledge, London; Boston : Routledge and K. Paul, 1977. ISBN 978-1138972964
- with Steven Shapin (ed.), Natural order: historical studies of scientific culture, Beverly Hills, Calif; London : Sage Publications, 1979. ISBN 978-0803909595
- with David Edge (ed.), Science in context : readings in the sociology of science, Milton Keynes : Open University Press, 1982.
- T. S. Kuhn and Social Science (Traditions in Social Theory), London : Macmillan, 1982. ISBN 978-0333289372
- About science, Oxford : Basil Blackwell, 1985.
- The Nature of power, Cambridge : Polity, 1988. ISBN 978-0745600734
- Grays Thurrock district : a pictorial history, Chichester : Phillimore, 1988; 1991.
- The Elements of social theory, London : UCL Press, 1995.
- with David Bloor & John Henry, Scientific knowledge : a sociological analysis, Chicago : University of Chicago Press, 1996.

== Selected articles ==
- On the Conventional Character of Knowledge and Cognition in: Philosophy of the Social Sciences 11/3, 1981, pp. 303–333-
- Relativism, Rationalism and the Sociology of Knowledge (with David Bloor) in: Hollis, M./Lukes, S. (ed.): Rationality and Relativism, Cambridge (Mass.), MIT Press, 1982, pp. 21–47. ISBN 978-0262580618
- On the Extensions of Concepts and the Growth of Knowledge in: Sociological Review 30/1, 1982, pp. 23–45.
- Relativism as a Completion of the Scientific Project in: Schantz, R./Seidel, M. (ed.): The Problem of Relativism in the Sociology of (Scientific) Knowledge, Frankfurt, ontos, 2011, pp. 23–39. ISBN 978-3868381283
