= David Gooding =

British philosopher (1947–2009)

- Born: David Charles Gooding; 21 November 1947
- Died: 13 December 2009 (aged 62)

Philosophical work
- Institutions: Science Studies Centre, University of Bath
- Main interests: History and philosophy of Science

David Charles Gooding (21 November 1947 – 13 December 2009) was a professor of history and philosophy of science, and the director of the Science Studies Centre, at the University of Bath, UK. He was president of the History of Science Section of the BAAS (2002–2003).

== Career ==
For over 30 years Gooding wrote and lectured on the role of visualisation, inference, communication, creativity and human agency in the sciences and was a specialist on the life and work of Michael Faraday. During 2002–2003 he held a Leverhulme Research Fellowship for research on Visualisation in the Sciences. From 1991 to 1993 he held a Research Leave Fellowship from the MRC-ESRC-SERC (Joint Research Councils Initiative on HCI-Cognitive Science) for research on Simulating Natural Intelligence.

Gooding's work is characterised by a multi-disciplinary approach, combining perspectives and methods from different fields including philosophy, history, sociology, art and cognitive psychology. Gooding's notion of Construal is of key importance to the field of Empirical Modelling within Computer Science.

== Selected works ==
=== Books ===
- Gooding, David; James, Frank A. J. L. (1985). Faraday rediscovered: essays on the life and work of Michael Faraday, 1791–1867. Basingstoke, Hants, England New York City: Macmillan Press Stockton Press. ISBN 9780333393208.
- Gooding, David; Pinch, Trevor; Schaffer, Simon (1989). The uses of experiment: studies in the natural sciences. Cambridge England New York: Cambridge University Press. ISBN 9780521337687.
- Gooding, David; Tweney, Ryan D. (1991). Michael Faraday's 'Chemical notes, hints, suggestions, and objects of pursuit' of 1822. London: P. Peregrinus in association with the Institution of Engineering and Technology. ISBN 9780863412554.
- Gooding, David (1990). Experiment and the making of meaning: human agency in scientific observation and experiment. Dordrecht, Netherlands: Kluwer Academic Publishers. ISBN 9780792307198.
- Gooding, David; Cantor, Geoffrey; James, Frank A. J. L. (1996). Michael Faraday. Amherst, New York: Humanity Books. ISBN 9781573925563.
- Gooding, David C.; Tweney, Ryan D.; Gorman, Michael E.; Kincannon, Alexandra P. (2005). Scientific and technological thinking. Mahwah, New Jersey: L. Erlbaum. ISBN 9780805845297.

=== Book chapters ===
- Gooding, David (1992), "Putting agency back into experiment", in Pickering, Andrew (ed.), Science as practice and culture, Chicago: University of Chicago Press, pp. 65–112, ISBN 9780226668017.
- Gooding, David (1999), "Thought experiment", in Craig, E. (ed.), The encyclopaedia of philosophy, volume 9, London: Routledge, pp. 392–397, ISBN 9780415073103.
- Gooding, David (2000), "Experiment", in Newton-Smith, William (ed.), A companion to the philosophy of science, Oxford: Blackwells, pp. 117–126, ISBN 9780631230205.
- Gooding, David (2001), "Experiment as an instrument of innovation: experience and embodied thought", in Benyon, Meurig; et al. (eds.), Cognitive technology: instruments of mind, Heidelberg: Springer, pp. 130–140, ISBN 9783540424062.
- Gooding, David (2003), "Narrowing the cognitive span: experimentation, visualisation and digitalisation", in Radner, Hans (ed.), The philosophy of scientific experimentation, Pittsburgh: University of Pittsburgh Press, pp. 255–284, ISBN 9780822957959.
- Gooding, David (2008), "Envisioning explanation: the art in science", in Frischer, Bernard; Kakouri-Hild, Anastasia (eds.), Beyond illustration: 2D and 3D digital technologies as tools for discovery in archaeology, Oxford / Washington D.C.: Archaeopress (British Archaeological Reports Series) / American Council of Learned Societies (Humanities E-Book), pp. 1–20, ISBN 9781407302928.
- Gooding, David (2004), "Visualization, inference and explanation in the sciences", in Malcolm, Grant (ed.), Multidisciplinary approaches to visual representations and interpretations, Amsterdam: Elsevier, pp. 1–26, ISBN 9780080537139.
- Gooding, David C. (2005), "Seeing the forest for the trees: visualisation, cognition, and scientific inference", in Gooding, David C.; Tweney, Ryan D.; Gorman, Michael E.; et al. (eds.), Scientific and technological thinking, Mahwah, New Jersey: L. Erlbaum, pp. 173–218, ISBN 9780805845297.

=== Journal articles ===
- Gooding, David C. (2004). "Cognition, construction and culture: visual theories in the sciences". Journal of Cognition and Culture. 4 (3): 551–593. doi:10.1163/1568537042484896.
- Gooding, David C. (September 2004). "Envisioning explanations – the art in science". Interdisciplinary Science Reviews. 29 (3): 278–294. Bibcode:2004ISRv...29..278G. doi:10.1179/030801804225018792. S2CID 31921171.
- Gooding, David C. (Spring 2006). "From phenomenology to field theory: Faraday's visual reasoning". Perspectives on Science. 14 (1): 40–65. doi:10.1162/posc.2006.14.1.40. S2CID 15515015.
- Gooding, David C. (December 2006). "Visual cognition: where cognition and culture meet". Philosophy of Science. 73 (5): 688–698. doi:10.1086/518523. S2CID 59195373.
- Gooding, David C.; Addis, Tom R. (March 2008). "Simulation methods for an abductive system in science". Foundations of Science. 13 (1): 37–52. doi:10.1007/s10699-007-9113-8. S2CID 62165475.
- Gooding, David C. (January 2010). "Visualizing scientific inference". Topics in Cognitive Science. 2 (1): 15–35. doi:10.1111/j.1756-8765.2009.01048.x. PMID 25163619.
