= Leviathan and the Air-Pump =

Book by Steven Shapin and Simon Schaffer

- Cover of the first edition
- Author: Steven Shapin and Simon Schaffer
- Language: English
- Publisher: Princeton University Press, Princeton, New Jersey
- Publication date: 1985
- Publication place: United States
- Media type: Print
- Pages: 440
- ISBN: 0-691-08393-2
- OCLC: 21974013
- Dewey Decimal: 533/.5 19
- LC Class: QC166 .S47 1985
- Identifiers refer to the 1989 First Princeton Paperback Edition unless otherwise noted

Leviathan and the Air-Pump: Hobbes, Boyle, and the Experimental Life (published 1985) is a book by Steven Shapin and Simon Schaffer. It examines the debate between Robert Boyle and Thomas Hobbes over Boyle's air-pump experiments in the 1660s. In 2005, Shapin and Schaffer were awarded the Erasmus Prize for this work.

On a theoretical level, the book explores the acceptable methods of knowledge production, and social factors related to the different knowledge systems promoted by Boyle and Hobbes. The "Leviathan" in the title is Hobbes's book on the structure of society, Leviathan, or The Matter, Forme and Power of a Common Wealth Ecclesiasticall and Civil and the "Air-Pump" is Robert Boyle's mechanical instrument. The book also contains a translation by Schaffer of Hobbes's Dialogus physicus de natura aeris. It attacked Boyle and others who founded the society for experimental research, soon known as the Royal Society.

== Intention of the work ==
Shapin and Schaffer state in their first chapter, "Understanding Experiment", that they wish to answer the question, "Why does one do experiments in order to arrive at scientific truth?" Their aim is to use a historical account of the debate over the validity of Boyle's air pump experiments, and by extension his experimental method, to discover the origins of the credibility that we give experimentally produced facts today. The authors wish to avoid "'The self-evident'" method, which (they explain) is when historians project the values of their current culture onto the time period that they are studying (in this case valuing the benefits of empiricism). They wish to take a "stranger's" viewpoint when examining the debate between Hobbes and Boyle because, in the 1660s, both methods of knowledge production were well respected in the academic community and the reasons that Boyle's experimentalism prevailed over Hobbes's natural philosophy would not have been obvious to contemporaries.

They explain that, traditionally, Hobbes's position on natural philosophy has been dismissed by historians because historians perceived Hobbes as "misunderstanding" Boyle's work. Thus, in Leviathan and the Air-Pump, Shapin and Schaffer aim to avoid bias and consider both sides' arguments with equal weight. In addition, they comment on the social instability of Restoration society post-1660. They aim to show that the debate between these two contemporaries had political implications beyond the intellectual sphere, and that accepting Hobbes' or Boyle's method of knowledge production was also to accept a social philosophy.

== Chapter II: Seeing and Believing: The Experimental Production of Pneumatic Facts ==
Chapter Two outlines Boyle's theory of knowledge production, which revolves around the creation of the "matter of fact". This refers to an experimentally generated piece of knowledge separate from a universal theory and that was based on probability. This is in direct opposition to Hobbes (discussed in chapter 3), who required "absolute certainty" based on "logic and geometry" to consider a phenomenon a fact. In the eyes of Boyle and his colleagues, the abandonment of absolute certainty was not "a regrettable retreat from more ambitious goals; it was celebrated as a wise rejection of a failed project". Thus, because "matters of fact" did not have to be absolute, universal assent was not necessary for the production of knowledge. Boyle made use of three knowledge-producing technologies in order to produce knowledge: "a material technology embedded in the construction and operation of the air-pump; a literary technology by means of which the phenomena produced by the pump were made known to those who were not direct witnesses; and a social technology that incorporated the conventions that experimental philosophers should use in dealing with each other and considering knowledge-claims".

Importantly, Shapin and Schaffer give a description of the "material technology," the air-pump itself, essentially a suction pump attached to a replaceable glass bulb. When the pump was set in motion, the air would be evacuated from the glass bulb thus creating what we now consider to be a vacuum, but what for contemporaries was a space of great debate (explained below). However, the integrity of the pump was far from perfect and this leaking is central to the arguments both for and against experimentalism. Shapin and Schaffer assert that three important points should be taken into account when considering the pump itself: "(1) that both the engine's integrity and its limited leakage were important resources for Boyle in validating his pneumatic finding and their proper interpretation; (2) that the physical integrity of the machine was vital to the perceived integrity of the knowledge the machine helped to produce; and (3) that the lack of its physical integrity was a strategy used by critics, particularly Hobbes, to deconstruct Boyle's claims and to substitute alternative accounts".

The arguments about experimentally generated knowledge revolve around two of Boyle's experiments. The first experiment is the Torricellian apparatus placed within the exhausted receiver (the bulb). The result is that the liquid in the inverted tube of the Torricellian apparatus falls, but not to the level of the liquid in the dish at the base of the inverted tube. For Boyle, the water level fell because the air was being evacuated from the bulb and thus its spring and weight were no longer acting on the liquid around the base of the tube holding the liquid in the inverted tube up. The fact that the water did not fall completely to the bottom of the tube was explained (for Boyle) by the existence of air in the bulb that occurred due to leakage. However Boyle was careful not to commit to saying that a vacuum existed in the bulb; he stated only that when air was sucked out of the bulb the level of the liquid in the inverted tube fell - this was the nature of a matter of fact. The second experiment was based on the theory of cohesion - that "two smooth bodies, such as marble or glass discs, can be made spontaneously to cohere when pressed against each other". Boyle's idea was that if two cohered discs were placed in the receiver of the air-pump they would spontaneously separate without the air's pressure to keep them together. However, when the receiver was evacuated, they did not separate - a result which Boyle blamed on leakage and the fact that he could not get enough air out of the receiver to reduce the air's pressure to an appropriate level. It should be noted here that Boyle's definitions of "pressure" and "spring" were never clearly defined, which we shall see is one of Hobbes's major complaints.

The air-pump granted access to a whole new branch of "elaborate" experiments. In order to witness the phenomena produced by the pump, one had to have access to a pump - which was vastly expensive and difficult to build. However, the space in which the existing pumps did work was arguably a public space - albeit a restricted one. "The laboratory was, therefore, a disciplined space, where experimental, discursive, and social practices were collectively controlled by competent members". The collective viewing of the air-pump experiments avoided the problem of single eye-witness testimony (which was unreliable), and it offered a space for discourse. This social space for discourse had two important restrictions: "dispute over matters of fact" was not allowed, and "the rules of the game by which maters of fact were experimentally produced" was not to be disputed. "In Boyle's view the capacity of experiments to yield matters of fact depended not only upon their actual performance but essentially upon the assurance of the relevant community that they had been so performed". In order to expand his audience (and credibility) Boyle recommended to the academic community that replication was crucial, though he admitted that others "[would] find it no easy task". As such, the literary technology was used to create "virtual witnessing" - a technique in which description of the experimental scene is written so that the reader can envision the experiment. "Stipulations about how to write proper scientific prose were dispersed throughout [Boyle's] experimental reports of the 1660s, but he also composed a special tract on the subject of 'experimental essays.'" Everything about how Boyle instructed other experimentalists to write stressed honesty. He wanted readers to read circumstantial accounts of failed experiments as well as successes, and he asserted that all physical causes should be stated as only "probable."

In summation, Boyle's theory of knowledge production revolves around assent. All three technologies work towards allowing as many people as possible to come to an agreement about a "matter of fact."

== Chapter III: Seeing Double: Hobbes's Politics of Plenism before 1660 ==
The third chapter centers on Hobbes' side of the debate for the effective production of knowledge. However, unlike Boyle, Hobbes denies that natural philosophy can be separated from politics and religion. In the previous chapter, Boyle's "matter of fact" worked towards separation from church and state by remaining objective and probabilistic. For Hobbes, however, "the boundaries Boyle proposed to erect and maintain were guarantees of continued disorder, not remedies to philosophical dissension". Hobbes also argued for "proper metaphysical language", in contrast to Boyle's reluctance to address the issue of a vacuum and his vague concept of air "pressure." Hobbes was motivated by three things in his attack on Boyle: (1) to save his own reputation as a natural philosopher, (2) to develop a system of knowledge production that secured order and maintained proper goals for natural philosophy (namely precision instead of probability) and (3) to be sensitive to the needs of Restoration society (discussed in more detail in chapter 7).

Hobbes' denial of a vacuum stems in part from a need for political stability. It follows logically that if there can be a space which is devoid of matter, then that is proof of "incorporeal substance" - an idea that was adopted by priests to gain the allegiance of the people by promising the safety of this substance, the immortal soul. This splits the allegiance of each person in a country between the Church and the Monarch, which creates social instability and ultimately, for Hobbes, the risk of civil war. He considered incorporeal substance a priestly conspiracy to "usurp power" from the true and legitimate leader - the King. The conflict could be resolved "by collapsing the hierarchy [spiritual government and material government] in favour of matter". "It was to that end that Leviathan proffered a materialist and monist natural philosophy.".

Leviathan also instructs that the way to produce good theories is through good definition of terms, the use of materialist and monist theory, and the equal importance of ontology and epistemology ("Show men what knowledge is and you will show them the grounds of assent and social order"). Hobbes works from a model of geometry, and the aims of his natural philosophy share the same precision as geometry. That is why, for Hobbes, good definition is extremely important. Hobbes also rejects the idea that the senses were reliable enough to be able to provide factual knowledge because "the same impressions could be obtained dreaming or waking, by the motions of matter in real external object or by rubbing the eyes". Instead, Hobbes posits that man's own agency is the place for natural philosophy, once again drawing on geometry: "'as we know, that, if the figure shown be a circle, then any straight line through the centre shall divide it into two equal parts.' 'And this,' Hobbes said, 'is the knowledge required in a philosopher.'" Thus, belief played no part in Hobbes' concept of a fact, and this ran in opposition to Boyle because Boyle's "matters of fact" required the consensus of a group of witnesses who all believed the same thing. "Knowledge was constituted when all believed alike. Likewise for Boyle's clerical allies, religion was a matter of belief and giving witness to that belief...[Hobbes] strategy was one of behavioural control, not one of internal moral control. It was not that the control of belief was wrong; it was that such control was impractical and an inadequate surety for order."

Artfully, this chapter ends, "For Hobbes, the rejection of vacuum was the elimination of a space within which dissension could take place."

== Chapter IV: The Trouble with Experiment: Hobbes versus Boyle ==
As the chapter title suggests, this chapter focuses on how these two historical figures interacted. It starts with a list of Hobbes' criticisms of Boyle:

- [Hobbes] was skeptical about the allegedly public and witnessed character of experimental performances, and, therefore, of the capacity to generate consensus, even within the experimental rules of the game.
- He regarded the experimental programme as otiose. It was pointless to perform a systematic series of experiments, for if one could, in fact, discern causes from natural effects, then a single experiment should suffice.
- He denied the status of "philosophy" to the outcome of the experimental programme. "Philosophy", for Hobbes, was the practice of demonstrating how effects followed from causes, or of inferring causes from effects. The experimental programme failed to satisfy this definition.
- He systematically refused to credit experimentalists' claims that one could establish a procedural boundary between observing the positive regularities produced by experiment (facts) and identifying the physical cause that accounts for them (theories).
- He persistently treated experimentalists' "hypotheses" and "conjectures" as statements about real causes.
- He contended that, whatever hypothetical cause or state of nature Boyle adduced to explain his experimentally produced phenomena, an alternative and superior explanation could be proffered and was, in fact, already available. In particular, Hobbes stipulated that Boyle's explanations invoked vacuism. Hobbes's alternatives proceed from plenism.
- He asserted the inherently defeasible character of experimental systems and therefore the knowledge experimental practices produced.

Hobbes criticized Boyle's experimental space for being private (as it was exclusive to everyone but empiricists) and insisted that the space had a "master" - which undermined Boyle's concept of free discourse and consensus to generate matters of fact. Also he criticized the fact that, since the whole experimental community must come into agreement before a "matter of fact" can be produced, the whole experimental community must view the same demonstration at the same time. This was an obvious impossibility and was problematic for Boyle because "If they were not witnessed simultaneously and together, then in what ways was the evaluation of experimental testimony different from the evaluation of testimony generally?"

Hobbes also criticized the air-pump itself, saying that "the physical integrity of the machine was massively violated." He asserted that "it was impossible to understand the air-pump experiments 'unless the nature of the air is known first.'" This was important for three reasons: (1) because Hobbes said the fluidity of the air ruled out the ability to produce an impermeable seal (2) because describing the air as mixture allowed Hobbes to explain the pumps actions (drawing out the course aspects of the air and leaving behind the more subtle fluid) and (3) because Hobbes said that, since Boyle could not offer a cause for the spring of the air, that made him an inadequate natural philosopher. Indeed, it was Boyle's recommendation to ignore causes that Hobbes found intolerable. It was not an objection to the empirical method. Hobbes only ever doubted the senses as a reliable source of information. He makes an example of the motion of a person's blood, "for no one feels the motion of their blood unless it pours forth," as proof of the unreliability of the senses. Yet he did not object to Harvey's work to prove the motion of the blood - rather he even considered himself a "methodological ally" of Harvey's "both denying the foundational nature and of personal experience."

"Thus for Hobbes, the task of the natural philosopher was to approach as near as he could to the products of the geometer and the civic philosopher" while "Boyle's compulsion was only partial; there was room to differ and tolerance was essential to the maintenance of this partial and liberal compulsion. Managed dissent within the moral community of experimentalists was safe. Uncontrollable divisiveness and civil war followed from any other course."

== Chapter V: Boyle's Adversaries: Experiment Defended ==
While the previous chapter focuses on the attacks of Boyle's main opponent (Hobbes), this chapter focuses on Boyle's actions in the face of more general adversity. The three main opponents to Boyle were Hobbes, Linus and More, and Boyle's response to each in turn reflects his opinion of their ideas and shows what parts of his own ideas he deemed essential and what parts he deemed less so. The figures can be divided into two groups: Linus - who conformed to the model of the experimental programme but did not agree with Boyle's explanation of the air-pump experiments, and Hobbes and More - who attacked the experimental programme as an institution.

"Linus said there was no vacuum in the Torricellian space. This was apparent because one could see through that space; if there were a vacuum, 'no visible species could proceed either from it, or through it, unto the eye." Linus offered a nonmechanical solution to the sustained height of the liquid in the Torricellian apparatus. He suggested that "a certain internal thread (funiculus) whose upper extremity was attached to the finger [blocking the top of the inverted tube] and whose lower extremity was attached to the surface of the mercury." He also explained that, in the marble disc experiment, the fault was not with the air-pump but rather with Boyle's theory of the spring of the air. Thus, as far as experimental procedure was concerned, Linus was following the rules. So how would Boyle respond? While Boyle's response contained a restatement of the rules of experimentation, a restatement of the boundaries of experimental philosophy, a defense of his mechanical interpretation, and a particular defense of the spring of the air, Boyle took great pains to "make clear that he generally approved of Linus's manner of constructing and delivering his criticisms." Linus was fully welcomed into the experimental community despite his difference of opinion. Thus, "in his Defense Boyle would therefore demonstrate not merely that Linus was wrong, but also how experimental controversies ought to be conducted." In his Defense, Boyle restated that "he could not understand why Linus, like Hobbes, had attacked him as a vacuist when he had explicitly declared his nescience on the matter and had identified the question as metaphysical in character" and thus out of the range of experimental exploration.

Hobbes on the other hand attacked the validity of the experimental programme itself. "Boyle's response to Hobbes was fundamentally a defense of the integrity and value of experimental practices." Boyle's reply included a technical response detailing the changes he had made to the pump (immersing it in water), a reiteration of the rules of experimental discourse, "an experimental programme devoted to clearing up the troubles which Hobbes had pointed to in his comments on New Experiments," and an ideological rejection of Hobbes's natural philosophy. In his reiteration of the rules of experimental discourse he defended his empirical method by asserting that the argument was over the interpretation of matters of fact and not the facts themselves, thus keeping the experimental way of life out of the line of fire. In response to Hobbes's criticism that the air had a subtler part that permeated the pump, Boyle stated that "this aether must either be demonstrated by experiment to exist or it was to be regarded as a metaphysical entity", which Boyle has excluded from the scope of the experimental method.

Henry More had three main arguments in relation to Boyle: "(1) that matter itself was passive, inert and stupid; (2) that its motion was guided by 'some Immaterial Being that exercises its directive Activity on the Matter of the World'; (3) that mechanism alone was an inadequate way of accounting for Boyle's phenomena." He insisted that natural philosophy could be used "as [a weapon] in theology" which we have seen is an area that Boyle wished to keep separate from the experimental method. Thus, in response, Boyle "defended the autonomy and status of his [experimental] community" as separate from other social bodies (such as the Church) and wrote "of 'the doctor's grand and laudable design, wherein [he] heartily wish[ed] him much success of proving the existence of an incorporeal substance.'" "Boyle argued that because More's spirit was not a physical principle it could not be part of the language of organized experimenters."

Thus, from this chapter we see that above all Boyle wished to defend his experimental method, its separation from other bodies of knowledge, and lastly his personal claims about the spring of the air.

== Chapter VI: Replication and Its Troubles: Air-Pumps in the 1660s ==
Chapter 6 is an evaluation of the technologies stated in chapter 2 and their role in replication - namely replication of the material technology and the utility of virtual witnessing. The chapter focuses on the propagation of the pump via the experimental community.

The air-pump was first developed in Oxford and London with the help of the Royal Society (and in response to Hobbes criticism) beginning in 1659. It was during its development that Robert Moray wrote to Christiaan Huygens (Holland) detailing the changes Boyle would be making to the original design of his pump. Huygens rejected Boyle's changes and set about making his own alterations. "Christiaan Huygens was the only natural philosopher in the 1660s who built an air-pump that was outside the direct management of Boyle and Hooke." At the end of Huygens development, Huygens claimed that "my pneumatic pump was begun to work since yesterday, and all that night a bladder stayed inflated within it [which was a test for the goodness of a pump]...which Mr. Boyle was not able to effect."

Indeed, he discovered a phenomenon called anomalous suspension (the suspension of water in a Toricellian apparatus when the water was purged of air, but when a bubble was introduced the water fell) "whose outcome measured the excellence of any air-pump...[and] to interpret this calibration phenomenon, Huygens had summoned into existence a new fluid and challenged the sufficiency of the weight and spring of common air. The effect of this fluid was only visible in good pumps." However, "for more than eighteen months neither of Huygens' claims were granted the status of matters of fact" and it is in this time period that we see how the troubles of replication were dealt with by contemporaries. The dispute resulted in a flurry of letters between Boyle and Huygens, each attacking the integrity of the other's machine (and by extension the theories of their makers). "So in March and April 1663 it became clear that unless the phenomenon could be produced in England with one of the two pumps available, then no one in England would accept the claims Huygens had made, or his competence in working the pump" - full and complete breakdown of the technology of virtual witnessing. Thus, Huygens travelled to London and became part of the Royal Society and replicated his matter of fact.

Another problem with replication was that the pumps were constantly being rebuilt, and so results would vary with each reconstruction.

According to Shapin and Schaffer there were two main problems with replication in the 1660s. (1) "The accomplishment of replication was dependent on contingent acts of judgment. One cannot write down a formula saying when replication was or was not achieved" and (2) "if replication is the technology which turn belief into knowledge, then knowledge-production depends not just on the abstract exchange of paper and ideas but on the practical social regulation of men and machines." Thus, "the effective solution to the problem of knowledge was predicated upon a solution to the problem of social order."

== Chapter VII: Natural Philosophy and the Restoration: Interests in Dispute ==
"Hobbes and Boyle used the work of the 1640s and 1650s to give rival accounts of the right way to conduct natural philosophy" and, in chapter 7, Shapin and Schaffer show how those models were interpreted and supported by Restoration society. "The experience of the War and the Republic showed that disputed knowledge produced civil strife...Boyle's technologies could only gain assent within a secure social space for experimental practice...[while] Hobbes assaulted the security of that space because it was yet one more case of divided power."

In essence, Boyle's theory and Hobbes's theory are inspired by the same problem: what to do when people can't agree on the truth. Boyle's supporters "Wilkins and Ward were ejected from the universities...they argued against each other about the virtues of toleration or suppression of Dissent. Wilkins attacked the Uniformity Act as too coercive: he would have preferred that the Church 'stand without whipping.'" "These exchanges give considerable point to the proposals that Boyle and his allies produced for the establishment of a social space in which dissent would be safe and tolerable." In addition, "Sprat's History of the Royal Society (1667) labeled Hobbesian dogmatism as tyranny, and uncontrolled private judgement as enthusiasm. Such dangers were to be excluded from the community - otherwise debate would not be safe." "The works of Barlow, Pett, and Dury argued that the balance of disputing sects was better than a state that included a cowed and disaffected party coerced into silence." "With Hobbes in view...Glanvill insisted that 'dogmatizing is the great disturber both of our selves, and the world with-out us: for while we wed an opinion, we resolvedly ingage against every one that opposeth it...hence grow Schisms, heresies, and anomalies beyond Arithmetick."

Adversaries of the experimental method took offense in two ways. The first was to "satirize the low status of experimental labour" and label their discipline as little more than children playing with toys. And the second, more social ingrained argument, was that the division between Church and the discovery of "matters of fact" "would weaken, rather than strengthen, the fortunes of the Church." "Boyle portrayed the work of experiment as distinct from that of the Church. Yet its work was also valuable for the churchmen. If the rules of the experimental game were obeyed, then the game would work well for the godly. These were the aspects of experimental philosophy that More and his allies found useful at the Restoration." As we have seen previously, this allied relationship between natural philosophy and the clergy was unacceptable to Hobbes because it undermined the political authority of the King and caused social instability by splitting the allegiances of his subjects between his own temporal authority over their bodies and the spiritual authority harnessed by the clergy.

== Chapter VIII: The Polity of Science: Conclusions ==
In the final chapter of Leviathan and the Air-Pump, Shapin and Schaffer condense their vastly complicated picture of Restoration society and how it interacted with the development of modern science to three points. "First, scientific practitioners have created, selected, and maintained a polity within which they operate and make intellectual product; second, the intellectual product made within that polity has become an element in political activity and in the state; third, there is a conditional relationship between the nature of the polity occupied by scientific intellectual and the nature of the wider polity." In proving those three points they say they had three things to connect: "(1) the polity of the intellectual community; (2) the solution to the practical problem of making and justifying knowledge; and (3) the polity of the wider society" and that they did so by connecting three things: "(1) that the solution to the problem of knowledge is political...(2) that the knowledge thus produced and authenticated become an element in political action in the wider polity...[and] (3) that the contest among alternative forms of life and their characteristic forms of intellectual product depend on the political success of the various candidates in insinuating themselves into the activities of other institutions and other interest groups. He who has the most, and the most powerful, allies wins." This is a departure from the "self-evident" scholars who attribute the victory of the empirical method to its inherent "goodness" (discussed in chapter 1).

They end by relating their examination of Restoration society to their current social climate in the late twentieth century: "As we come to recognize the conventional and artifactual status of our forms of knowing, we put ourselves in a position to realize that it is ourselves and not reality that is responsible for what we know. Knowledge, as much as the state, is the product of human actions. Hobbes was right."

== Reception ==
The work has been described as a classic example in the history of science of the posing of a basic question on scientific rationality. Can the rationality of two sides in a debate be described, from outside, when hindsight operates and the "road not taken" by science is known? Margaret C. Jacob wrote that, for a time, it was the most influential book in the field of history of science, following the trend to relativism with its equation of "scientific discourses" with "strategies of power".

John L. Heilbron credits Shapin and Schaffer with picking important aspects of the development of experimental culture that are still relevant, citing specifically the problems with replication. However, he casts doubt upon the strength of the relationship between politics of the greater society and the politics within the Royal Society. In addition, Heilbron laments the absence of comparisons to the development of empiricism in the rest of Europe because it blinds the reader to what may have been peculiar to England's case.

Anna Marie Roos, on the other hand, writes that Shapin and Schaffer do indeed draw a connection between the history of science and the history of political thought, and that their resolution to remain impartial when examining the argument between Hobbes and Boyle forces historians of science and politics alike to recognize the relationship between the two branches of knowledge.

Lawrence M. Principe, in The Aspiring Adept: Robert Boyle and His Alchemical Quest, argues extensively that many of the conclusions reached by Shapin and Schaffer rest on inaccurate and at times presentist conceptions of Boyle's work.

Bruno Latour, in We Have Never Been Modern, critiques the book for its insufficient recognition of the fact that just as politics informs notions of the natural world, so too does the natural world influence politics.

Noel Malcolm and Cornelis Leijenhorst deny the political background of the Hobbes-Boyle controversy. They argue that Hobbes' rejection of the void has no political agenda and has nothing to do with his attack on incorporeal substances, as Shapin and Schaffer claim. Both Malcolm and Leijenhorst call attention to the remarkable fact that Hobbes was already attacking incorporeal substances when he was a vacuist, and long before he became a plenist.

Frank Horstmann, in Leviathan und die Erpumper. Erinnerungen an Thomas Hobbes in der Luftpumpe, has criticized Shapin and Schaffer's use of the historical evidence. He argues that Shapin and Schaffer have a lot of important facts wrong. Before May 1648, for example, Hobbes preferred vacuist interpretations of experimental pneumatics and strictly rejected plenist interpretations as not imaginable; but Shapin and Schaffer turn the vacuist into a plenist by ignoring all the vacuist interpretations and by producing a very faulty translation as a putative proof for a plenist interpretation. Horstmann argues that there are many similar errors and wrong quotations in Leviathan and the Air-Pump and suggests that the chapters dealing with Hobbes are constructed on heavy and sometimes systematic misrepresentations of the historical record.

In the introduction of the 2011 second edition of their book, the authors reflect on the initial reception of the first edition (mild, according to them) before it became considered a classic later on. They also point to the diverse and mixed reviews at the time.

== Publication history ==
=== English editions ===
- (Hardcover) Shapin, Steven; Schaffer, Simon (1985). Leviathan and the air-pump : Hobbes, Boyle, and the experimental life : including a translation of Thomas Hobbes, Dialogus physicus de natura aeris by Simon Schaffer (1st ed.). Princeton, New Jersey: Princeton University Press. ISBN 0-691-08393-2. OCLC 12078908.
- (Paperback) Shapin, Steven; Schaffer, Simon (1989) [1985]. Leviathan and the air-pump : Hobbes, Boyle, and the experimental life : including a translation of Thomas Hobbes, Dialogus physicus de natura aeris by Simon Schaffer (1st Princeton paperback printing, with corrections ed.). Princeton, New Jersey: Princeton University Press. ISBN 0-691-02432-4. OCLC 21974013.
- (eBook) Shapin, Steven; Schaffer, Simon (2011). Leviathan and the air-pump : Hobbes, Boyle, and the experimental life : with a new introduction by the authors (2nd ed.). Princeton, N.J.: Princeton University Press. ISBN 978-1-4008-3849-3. OCLC 759907750.
- (Paperback) Shapin, Steven; Schaffer, Simon (2017). Leviathan and the air-pump : Hobbes, Boyle, and the experimental life (First Princeton Classics paperback ed.). Princeton, N.J.: Princeton University Press. ISBN 978-0-691-17816-5. OCLC 984327399.

=== Translations ===
- Shapin, Steven; Schaffer, Simon (1993). Leviathan et la pompe à air: Hobbes et Boyle entre science et politique (in French). Translated by Piélat, Thierry; Barjansky, Sylvie. Paris: Ed. La Découverte. ISBN 978-2-7071-2273-5. OCLC 29400446.
- Shapin, Steven; Schaffer, Simon (1994). Il Leviatano e la pompa ad aria: Hobbes, Boyle e la cultura dell' esperimento (in Italian). Translated by Brigati, Roberto. Scandicci: La Nuova Italia. ISBN 978-88-221-1503-4. OCLC 849036629.
- Shapin, Steven; Schaffer, Simon (2006). 利維坦與空氣泵浦: 霍布斯, 波以耳與實驗生活 / Liweitan yu kong qi beng pu : Huobusi, Boyier yu shi yan sheng huo (in Chinese). 台北市 / Taibei Shi: 行人出版社 / Xing ren chu ban she. ISBN 978-986-81860-2-6. OCLC 467102599.
