= Simon Schaffer =

British historian of science (born 1955)

Simon Schaffer FBA
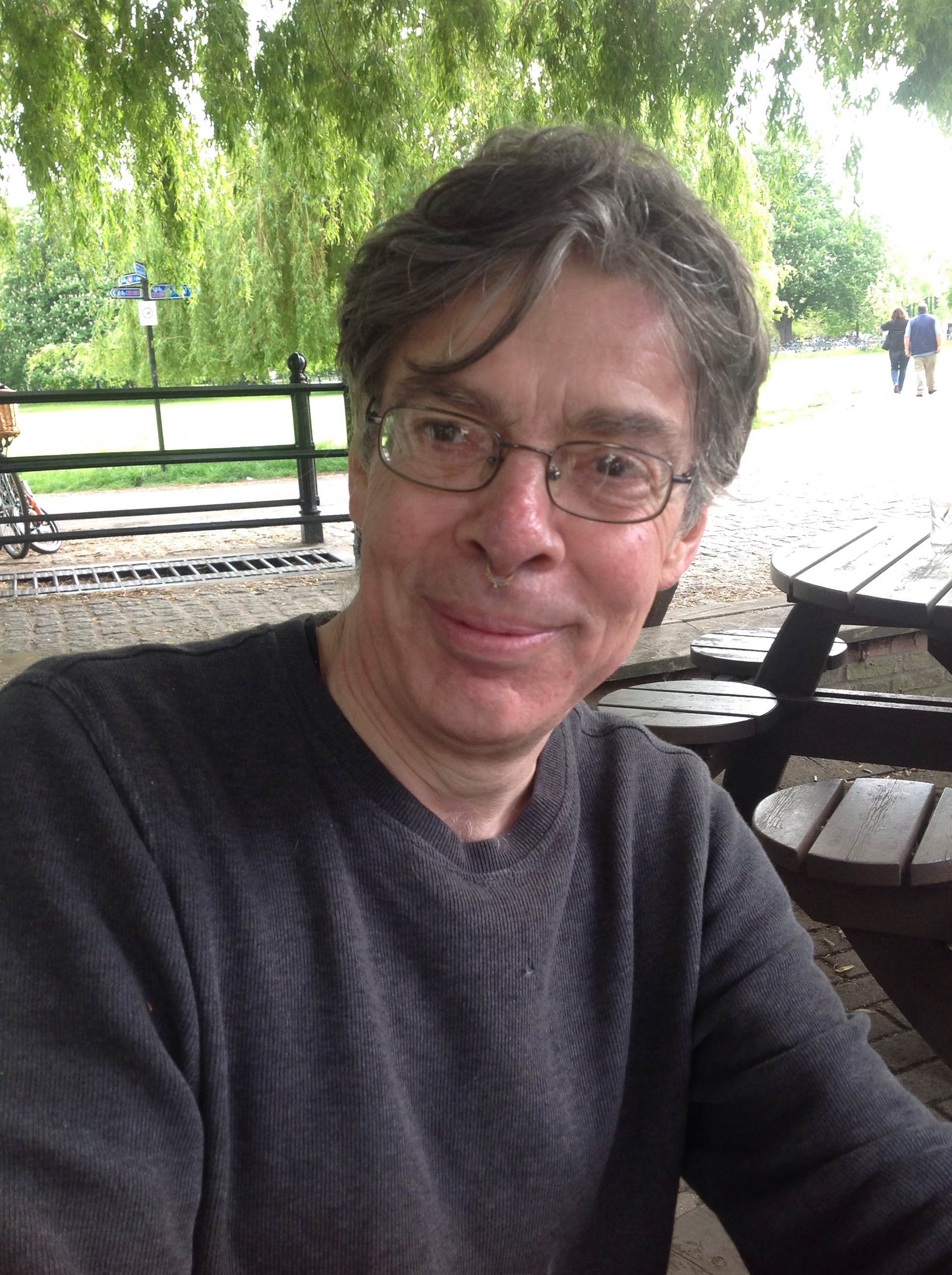
- Schaffer at a pub in Cambridge, 2015
- Born: 1 January 1955 (age 71); Southampton
- Education: Varndean Grammar School for Boys
- Alma mater: University of Cambridge (BA, PhD); Harvard University
- Awards: Erasmus Prize (2005); Sarton Medal (2013); Dan David Prize (2018)
- Scientific career
- Workplaces: University of Cambridge; Darwin College, Cambridge; Imperial College London; University of California, Los Angeles
- Thesis: Newtonian cosmology and the steady state (1980)
- Website: www.hps.cam.ac.uk/directory/schaffer

Simon J. Schaffer FBA (born 1 January 1955) is a historian of science, previously a professor of the history and philosophy of science at the Department of History and Philosophy of Science at the University of Cambridge and was editor of The British Journal for the History of Science from 2004 to 2009.

== Early life and education ==
Schaffer was born in Southampton in 1955. His family moved to Brisbane, Australia that same year, returning to the UK in 1965 to live in Brighton. His father, Bernard, was an academic social scientist who was a professorial fellow at the Institute of Development Studies at the University of Sussex from 1966 until his death in 1984. Simon's mother, Sheila, who died in 2010, was a university librarian and Labour councillor who was Mayor of Brighton in 1995.

Schaffer attended Varndean Grammar School for Boys in Brighton before studying Natural Sciences at Trinity College, Cambridge, specialising in the history and philosophy of science in his final year. While at Trinity, he captained the winning college team in the 1974 University Challenge. After completing his undergraduate degree, Schaffer went to Harvard University for a year as a Kennedy Scholar to study the history of science. He returned to Cambridge in 1976, and gained his PhD in 1980 with the thesis Newtonian cosmology and the steady state, while Fellow of St John's College, Cambridge.

== Career ==
During the early 1980s, Schaffer taught at Imperial College London. Since 1985, he has been a Fellow of Darwin College, Cambridge. He has also taught at the University of California, Los Angeles. He has authored or co-authored numerous books, including Leviathan and the Air-Pump: Hobbes, Boyle, and the Experimental Life with Steven Shapin. In addition to his work at Cambridge, he has been a presenter on the BBC, in particular the series Light Fantastic broadcast on BBC Four in 2004. He has been a regular contributor and reviewer for the London Review of Books. Schaffer has made multiple appearances on the BBC radio discussion series In Our Time.

=== Awards and honours ===
In 2005, Schaffer shared the Erasmus Prize with Steven Shapin for Leviathan and the Air-Pump. In 2013, he received the George Sarton Medal, the most prestigious honour awarded by the History of Science Society, in recognition of his contribution to the "history of science, not only as an academic discipline, but also as a source of broader intellectual inspiration and understanding". In 2018 he received the Dan David Prize. Schaffer was elected a Fellow of the British Academy in 2012.

=== Selected bibliography ===
- Shapin, Steven; Schaffer, Simon (1985). Leviathan and the air-pump: Hobbes, Boyle, and the experimental life. Princeton, New Jersey, U.S.: Princeton University Press. ISBN 9780691178165.
- Schaffer, Simon; Pinch, Trevor; Gooding, David (1989). The uses of experiment: studies in the natural sciences. Cambridge, England & New York, U.S.: Cambridge University Press. ISBN 9780521337687.
- Schaffer, Simon (1995). 'Accurate Measurement is an English Science,' The Values of Precision. Princeton, New Jersey, U.S.: Princeton University Press. ISBN 0-691-03759-0.
- Schaffer, Simon (2009). The brokered world : go-betweens and global intelligence, 1770–1820. Sagamore Beach, Massachusetts, U.S.: Science History Publications. ISBN 978-0881353747.
