= Geoffrey Cantor (historian) =

British historian

Geoffrey N. Cantor (born 1943) is Emeritus Professor of the History and Philosophy of Science at the University of Leeds and Honorary Senior Research Associate at UCL Department of Science and Technology Studies at University College London. He has written about Michael Faraday, the wave theory of light and the responses of the Quaker and Jewish religions to science. With John Hedley Brooke he delivered the 1995–1996 Gifford Lecture at the University of Glasgow, which were subsequently published as Reconstructing Nature: The Engagement of Science and Religion in 1998. He contributed to the SciPer Project, which researches the popularization of science in the periodicals of the 19th century, such as the Boy's Own Paper and Punch, and has lectured upon this subject at the Royal Institution in 2005.

== Selected works ==
- Quakers, Jews, and Science: Religious Responses to Modernity and the Sciences in Britain, 1650-1900, Oxford University Press, 2005, ISBN 0-19-927668-4, 420 pages
- Science Serialized: Representation of the Sciences in Nineteenth-century Periodicals, edited with Sally Shuttleworth, MIT Press, 2004, ISBN 0-262-03318-6, 358 pages
- Science in the Nineteenth-century Periodical: Reading the Magazine of Nature, edited with Gowan Dawson, Graeme Gooday, Cambridge University Press, 2004, ISBN 0-521-83637-9, 329 pages
- Reconstructing Nature: Engagement of Science and Religion, authored with John Hedley Brooke, Continuum International Publishing Group, 2000, ISBN 0-567-08725-5, 450 pages
- Michael Faraday, authored with David Gooding, Prometheus Books, 1996, ISBN 0-391-03981-4, 111 pages
- Michael Faraday: Sandemanian and Scientist : a Study of Science and Religion in the Nineteenth Century, St. Martin's Press, 1991, ISBN 0-312-06669-4, 359 pages
- Optics After Newton: Theories of Light in Britain and Ireland, 1704-1840, Manchester University Press, 1983, ISBN 0-7190-0938-3, 257 pages
