= David Bloor =

British sociologist

- Born: 1942 (age 83–84); Derby, England
- Education: University of Edinburgh
- Known for: Strong Programme; Science and technology studies (STS); Sociology of scientific knowledge (SSK)
- Scientific career
- Fields: Sociology
- Workplaces: University of Edinburgh

David Bloor (/blʊər/; born 1942) is a British sociologist. He is a professor in, and a former director of, the Science Studies Unit at the University of Edinburgh. He is a key figure in the Edinburgh school and played a major role in the development of the field of science and technology studies. He is best known for advocating the strong programme in the sociology of scientific knowledge, most notably in his book Knowledge and Social Imagery.

== Biography ==
He was born in Derby. He started his academic career in philosophy and psychology. In 1972 he was awarded a PhD by the University of Edinburgh for his thesis "Speech and the regulation of behaviour". In the 1970s he and Barry Barnes were the major figures of the strong programme, which put forward queries against philosophical a priorism in the understanding of scientific knowledge. This is an approach, popular in the philosophy of science, that simply precluded inquiries about science by treating successful scientific knowledge as simply true or rational without empirically investigating how such knowledge has come to be accepted as true or rational. Bloor's book Knowledge and Social Imagery (Routledge, 1976) is one of the key texts of the strong programme.

Bloor wrote extensively on the Kuhn/Popper debate, and is a representative figure of the sociology of scientific knowledge. In the 1980s when French scholars like Bruno Latour developed the actor-network theory (partially based on the strong programme), David Bloor strongly disagreed with the ANT camp when they argued that human and non-humans should be treated in an equivalent manner, going so far as to write an article entitled "Anti-Latour".

He was awarded the John Desmond Bernal Prize by the Society for Social Studies of Science in 1996 in recognition of his distinguished contribution to the field.

== Publications ==
=== Books ===
- Bloor, David (1983). Wittgenstein: a social theory of knowledge. Macmillan and Columbia. doi:10.1007/978-1-349-17273-3.
- Bloor, David (1991) [1976]. Knowledge and social imagery (2nd ed.). Chicago, Illinois: University of Chicago Press.
- Bloor, David; Barnes, Barry; Henry, John (1996). Scientific knowledge: a sociological analysis. Athlone and Chicago University Press.
- Bloor, David (1997). Wittgenstein: rules and institutions. Routledge.
- Bloor, David (2011). The enigma of the aerofoil: rival theories in aerodynamics, 1909–1930. Chicago, Illinois: University of Chicago Press.

=== Selected articles ===
- Bloor, David (1970). "Is the Official Theory of Mind Absurd?". British Journal for the Philosophy of Science. 21 (2): 167–183. doi:10.1093/bjps/21.2.167.
- Bloor, David (1970). "Explanation and Analysis in Strawson's 'Persons'". Australasian Journal of Philosophy. 48 (1): 2–9. doi:10.1080/00048407012341411.
- Bloor, David (1971). "Two Paradigms for Scientific Knowledge?". Science Studies. 1: 101–115. doi:10.1177/030631277100100108. S2CID 144690847.
- Bloor, David (1973). "Wittgenstein and Mannheim on the sociology of mathematics". Studies in History and Philosophy of Science Part A. 4 (2): 173–191. Bibcode:1973SHPSA...4..173B. doi:10.1016/0039-3681(73)90003-4.
- Bloor, David (1981). "The strengths of the strong programme". Philosophy of the Social Sciences. 11: 199–213. doi:10.1177/004839318101100206. S2CID 149392510.
- Bloor, David (1982). "Durkheim and Mauss revisited: classification and the sociology of knowledge". Studies in the History and Philosophy of Science. 13 (4): 267–297. Bibcode:1982SHPSA..13..267B. doi:10.1016/0039-3681(82)90012-7.
- Bloor, David; Barnes, Barry (1982), "Relativism, rationalism and the sociology of knowledge", in Hollis, Martin; Lukes, Steven (eds.), Rationality and relativism, Cambridge, Massachusetts: MIT Press, ISBN 9780262580618
- Bloor, David (1982). "Reply to Gerd Buchdahl". Studies in History and Philosophy of Science Part A. 13 (4): 305–311. Bibcode:1982SHPSA..13..305B. doi:10.1016/0039-3681(82)90014-0.
- Bloor, David (1982). "Reply to Steven Lukes". Studies in History and Philosophy of Science Part A. 13 (4): 319–323. Bibcode:1982SHPSA..13..319B. doi:10.1016/0039-3681(82)90016-4.
- Bloor, David (1992), "Left and Right Wittgensteinians", in Pickering, Andrew (ed.), Science as practice and culture, Chicago, Illinois: University of Chicago Press, pp. 266–282, ISBN 9780226668017
- Bloor, David (1996). "Idealism and the sociology of knowledge". Social Studies of Science. 26 (4): 839–856. doi:10.1177/030631296026004005. S2CID 145513798.
- Bloor, David (1999). "Anti-Latour". Studies in the History and Philosophy of Science. 30 (1): 81–112. doi:10.1016/s0039-3681(98)00038-7. PMID 11623976.
- Bloor, David (2000). "Critical Notice on The Social Construction of What?". Canadian Journal of Philosophy. 30 (4): 597–608. doi:10.1080/00455091.2000.10717545.
- Bloor, David (2004), "Sociology of scientific knowledge", in Niiniluoto, Ilkka; Woleński, Jan; Sintonen, Matti (eds.), Handbook of epistemology, Dordrecht Boston: Kluwer Academic Publishers, pp. 919–962, ISBN 9781402019852
- Bloor, David (2005). "Toward a Sociology of Epistemic Things". Perspectives on Science. 13 (3): 285–312. doi:10.1162/106361405774287982. S2CID 57566089.
- Bloor, David (2007). "Epistemic Grace. Antirelativism as Theology in Disguise". Common Knowledge. 13 (2–3): 250–280. doi:10.1215/0961754x-2007-007.
- Bloor, David (2007). "Ideals and Monisms: Recent Criticisms of the Strong Programme in the Sociology of Knowledge". Studies in History and Philosophy of Science Part A. 38 (1): 210–234. Bibcode:2007SHPSA..38..210B. doi:10.1016/j.shpsa.2006.12.003.
- Bloor, David (2008), "Relativism at 30,000 feet", in Mazzotti, Massimo (ed.), Knowledge as Social Order: Rethinking the Sociology of Barry Barnes, Ashgate Publishing
- Bloor, David (2011), "Relativism and the sociology of knowledge", in Hales, Steven D. (ed.), A companion to relativism, Chichester, West Sussex, UK Malden, Massachusetts: Wiley-Blackwell, pp. 433–455, ISBN 9781405190213
