= Strong programme =

School of thought in sociology

The strong programme or strong sociology is a variety of the sociology of scientific knowledge (SSK) particularly associated with David Bloor, Barry Barnes, Harry Collins, Donald A. MacKenzie, and John Henry. The strong programme's influence on science and technology studies is credited as being unparalleled. The largely Edinburgh-based school of thought aims to illustrate how the existence of a scientific community, bound together by allegiance to a shared paradigm, is a prerequisite for normal scientific activity.

The strong programme is a reaction against "weak" sociologies of science, which restricted the application of sociology to "failed" or "false" theories, such as phrenology. Failed theories would be explained by citing the researchers' biases, such as covert political or economic interests. Sociology would be only marginally relevant to successful theories, which succeeded because they had revealed a fact of nature. The strong programme proposed that both "true" and "false" scientific theories should be treated the same way. Both are caused by social factors or conditions, such as cultural context and self-interest. All human knowledge, as something that exists in the human cognition, must contain some social components in its formation process.

== Characteristics ==
As formulated by David Bloor, the strong programme has four indispensable components:

1. Causality: it examines the conditions (psychological, social, and cultural) that bring about claims to a certain kind of knowledge.
2. Impartiality: it examines successful as well as unsuccessful knowledge claims.
3. Symmetry: the same types of explanations are used for successful and unsuccessful knowledge claims alike.
4. Reflexivity: it must be applicable to sociology itself.

== History ==
Because the strong programme originated at the 'Science Studies Unit,' University of Edinburgh, it is sometimes termed the Edinburgh School. However, there is also a Bath School associated with Harry Collins that makes similar proposals. In contrast to the Edinburgh School, which emphasizes historical approaches, the Bath School emphasizes microsocial studies of laboratories and experiments. The Bath school, however, does depart from the strong programme on some fundamental issues. In the social construction of technology (SCOT) approach developed by Collins' student Trevor Pinch, as well as by the Dutch sociologist Wiebe Bijker, the strong programme was extended to technology. There are SSK-influenced scholars working in science and technology studies programs throughout the world.

== Criticism ==
In order to study scientific knowledge from a sociological point of view, the strong programme has adhered to a form of radical relativism. In other words, it argues that – in the social study of institutionalised beliefs about "truth" – it would be unwise to use "truth" as an explanatory resource. To do so would (according to the relativist view) include the answer as part of the question, and propound a "whiggish" approach towards the study of history – a narrative of human history as an inevitable march towards truth and enlightenment.

Physicists Alan Sokal and Jean Bricmont published a critique of the Strong Programme called Fashionable Nonsense in 1997, which associated it with the broader concept of social constructionism. In their view, postmodernists on the far left attempted to recast scientific controversy as a political struggle between good (progressivism) and bad (conservatism), a form of Marxist class struggle. In Sokal and Bricmont's view, this leads to a dead end that obscures, rather than enlightens. They assert that the main error of the "Strong Program" is to ignore that scientists primarily use nature and mathematicians logic, not social pressures, to validate their findings. They argued that academics such as Feyerabend, Latour, Lacan, Irigaray, Kristeva (Ch3) and Deleuze regularly attempted to apply nonsensical metaphor from the physical sciences and mathematics to bolster their theories of how scientific agreements are achieved.

Philosopher Joseph Agassi argued that it is impossible to explain science by referring to social circumstances alone and that demanding that history do so is irrational.

Markus Seidel attacks the main arguments – underdetermination and norm-circularity – provided by Strong Programme proponents for their relativism. It has also been argued that the strong programme has incited climate denial.

== See also ==
- Historiography of science – History of the history of science
- Philosophy of science – Branch of philosophy
- Science studies – Research area analyzing scientific expertise
- Science wars – 1990s dispute in philosophy of science
- Social constructivism – Sociological theory of knowledge
- Sociology of Scientific Knowledge – Study of science as a social activity
- Sokal affair – 1996 scholarly publishing sting accepted by an academic journal

== Bibliography ==
- Barnes, B. (1977). Interests and the Growth of Knowledge. London: Routledge & Kegan Paul.
- Barnes, B. (1982). T. S. Kuhn and Social Science. London: Macmillan.
- Barnes, B. (1985). About Science. Oxford: Blackwell.
- Barnes, B. (1987). 'Concept Application as Social Activity', Critica 19: 19–44.
- Barnes, Barry (1992). "Realism, relativism and finitism". In Raven, Diederick; van Vucht Tijssen, Lieteke; de Wolf, Jan (eds.). Cognitive Relativism and Social Science. New Brunswick, New Jersey: Transaction Publishers. pp. 131–147. doi:10.4324/9780429336515-10. ISBN 978-0-88738-425-7. OCLC 925021352.
- Barnes, B., D. Bloor, and J. Henry. (1996), Scientific Knowledge: A Sociological Analysis. University of Chicago Press. [An introduction and summary of strong sociology]
- Bijker, Wiebe E., et al. The social construction of technological systems: New directions in the sociology and history of technology (MIT press, 2012)
- Bloor, D. (1991 [1976]), Knowledge and Social Imagery, 2nd ed. Chicago: University of Chicago Press. [outlines the strong programme]
- Bloor, D. (1997). Wittgenstein, Rules and Institutions. London: Routledge.
- Bloor, D. (1999). "Anti-Latour," Studies in the History and Philosophy of Science Part A 20#1 pp: 81–112.
- Collins, Harry, and Trevor Pinch. The Golem at large: What you should know about technology (Cambridge University Press, 2014)
- Latour, Bruno (1999). "For David Bloor and Beyond ... a reply to David Bloor's 'Anti-Latour'". Studies in History & Philosophy of Science Part A. 30 (1): 113–129. Archived from the original on 30 November 2006.
