= Sociology of scientific knowledge =

Study of science as a social activity

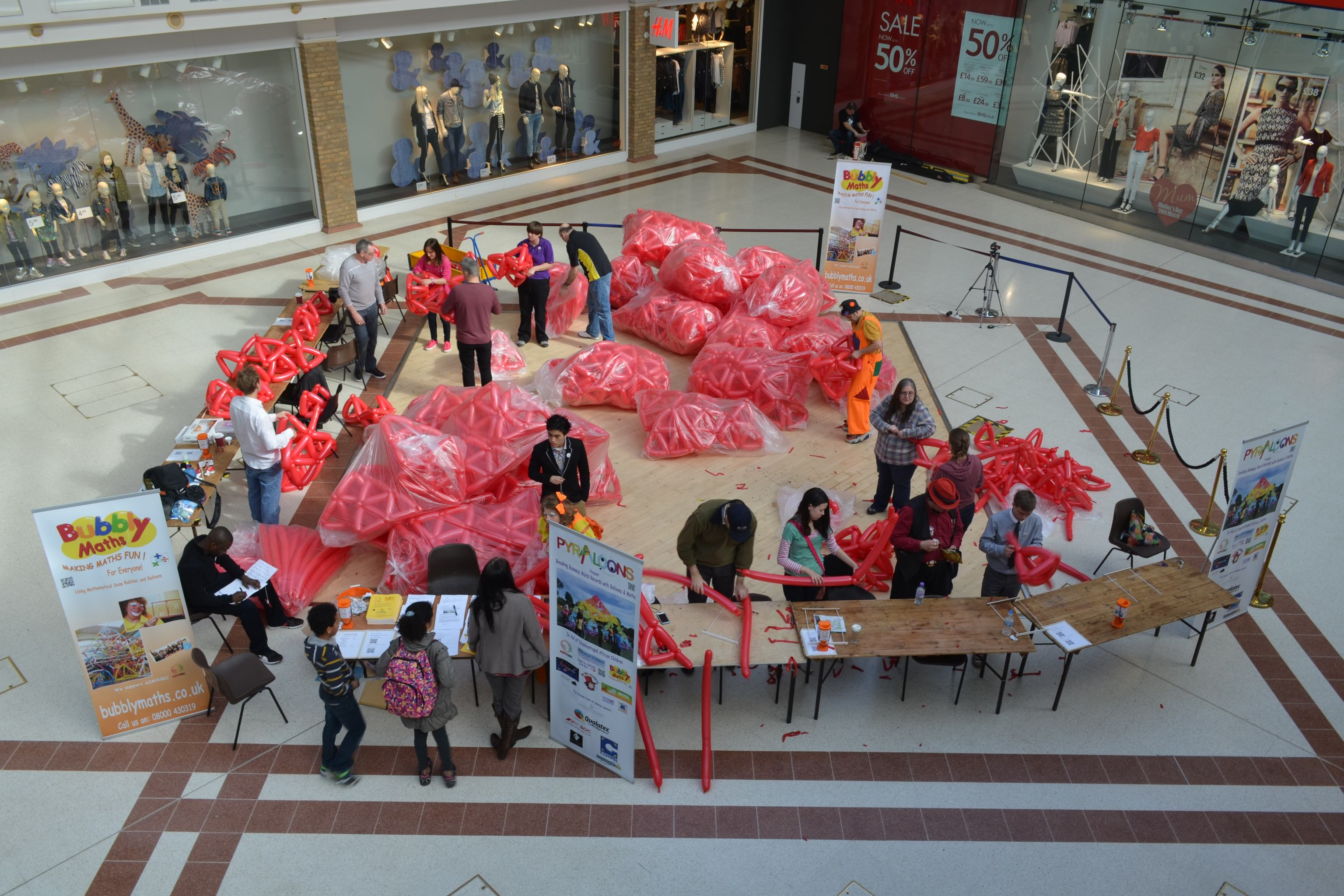
A hands-on activity at the 2014 Cambridge Science Festival, Cambridge, United Kingdom. Use of balloons to explore fundamental mathematics.

The sociology of scientific knowledge (SSK) is the study of science as a social activity, especially dealing with "the social conditions and effects of science, and with the social structures and processes of scientific activity." The sociology of scientific ignorance (SSI) is complementary to the sociology of scientific knowledge. For comparison, the sociology of knowledge studies the impact of human knowledge and the prevailing ideas on societies and relations between knowledge and the social context within which it arises.

Sociologists of scientific knowledge study the development of a scientific field and attempt to identify points of contingency or interpretative flexibility where ambiguities are present. Such variations may be linked to a variety of political, historical, cultural or economic factors. Crucially, the field does not set out to promote relativism or to attack the scientific project; the objective of the researcher is to explain why one interpretation rather than another succeeds due to external social and historical circumstances. Scientists have criticized sociological theories of scientific knowledge for ignoring the objective reality of nature when trying to explain how such knowledge is created.

The field emerged in the late 1960s and early 1970s and at first was an almost exclusively British practice. Other early centers for the development of the field were in France, Germany, and the United States (notably at Cornell University). Major theorists include Barry Barnes, David Bloor, Sal Restivo, Randall Collins, Gaston Bachelard, Harry Collins, Karin Knorr Cetina, Paul Feyerabend, Steve Fuller, Martin Kusch, Bruno Latour, Mike Mulkay, Derek J. de Solla Price, Lucy Suchman and Anselm Strauss.

== Programmes and schools ==
The sociology of scientific knowledge emerged in the 1970s in self-conscious opposition to the sociology of science associated with the American Robert K. Merton, generally considered one of the seminal authors in the sociology of science. Merton's was a kind of "sociology of scientists," which left the cognitive content of science out of sociological account; SSK by contrast aimed at providing sociological explanations of scientific ideas themselves, taking its lead from aspects of the work of Ludwik Fleck, Thomas S. Kuhn, but especially from established traditions in cultural anthropology (Durkheim, Mauss) as well as the late Wittgenstein. David Bloor, one of SSK's early champions, has contrasted the so-called 'weak programme' (or 'program'—either spelling is used) which merely gives social explanations for erroneous beliefs, with what he called the 'strong programme', which considers sociological factors as influencing all beliefs.

The weak programme is more of a description of an approach than an organised movement. The term is applied to historians, sociologists and philosophers of science who merely cite sociological factors as being responsible for those beliefs that went wrong. Imre Lakatos and (in some moods) Thomas S. Kuhn might be said to adhere to it. The strong programme is particularly associated with the work of two groups: the 'Edinburgh School' (David Bloor, Barry Barnes, and their colleagues at the Science Studies Unit at the University of Edinburgh) in the 1970s and '80s, and the 'Bath School' (Harry Collins and others at the University of Bath) in the same period. "Edinburgh sociologists" and "Bath sociologists" promoted, respectively, the Strong Programme and Empirical Programme of Relativism (EPOR). Also associated with SSK in the 1980s was discourse analysis as applied to science (associated with Michael Mulkay at the University of York), as well as a concern with issues of reflexivity arising from paradoxes relating to SSK's relativist stance towards science and the status of its own knowledge-claims (Steve Woolgar, Malcolm Ashmore).

The sociology of scientific knowledge has major international networks through its principal associations, 4S and EASST, with recently established groups in Japan, South Korea, Taiwan, and Latin America. It has made major contributions in recent years to a critical analysis of the biosciences and informatics.

== The sociology of mathematical knowledge ==
Studies of mathematical practice and quasi-empiricism in mathematics are also rightly part of the sociology of knowledge since they focus on the community of those who practice mathematics. Since Eugene Wigner raised the issue in 1960 and Hilary Putnam made it more rigorous in 1975, the question of why fields such as physics and mathematics should agree so well has been debated. Proposed solutions point out that the fundamental constituents of mathematical thought, space, form-structure, and number-proportion are also the fundamental constituents of physics. It is also worthwhile to note that physics is more than merely modeling of reality and the objective basis is upon observational demonstration. Another approach is to suggest that there is no deep problem, that the division of human scientific thinking through using words such as 'mathematics' and 'physics' is only useful in their practical everyday function to categorize and distinguish.

Fundamental contributions to the sociology of mathematical knowledge have been made by Sal Restivo and David Bloor. Restivo draws upon the work of scholars such as Oswald Spengler (The Decline of the West, 1918), Raymond Louis Wilder and Leslie Alvin White, as well as contemporary sociologists of knowledge and science studies scholars. David Bloor draws upon Ludwig Wittgenstein and other contemporary thinkers. They both claim that mathematical knowledge is socially constructed and has irreducible contingent and historical factors woven into it. More recently Paul Ernest has proposed a social constructivist account of mathematical knowledge, drawing on the works of both of these sociologists.

== Criticism ==
SSK has received criticism from theorists of the actor-network theory (ANT) school of science and technology studies. These theorists criticise SSK for sociological reductionism and a human centered universe. SSK, they say, relies too heavily on human actors and social rules and conventions settling scientific controversies. The debate is discussed in an article titled Epistemological Chicken.

Both scientists and philosophers have fiercely criticized sociological theories of scientific knowledge for ignoring the objective reality of nature and for the idea that the history of science should be written without regard for whether the scientific theories involved were actually correct. This conflict - later known as the science wars - was escalated by the book Higher Superstition: The Academic Left and Its Quarrels With Science by the biologist Paul R. Gross and the mathematician Norman Levitt (1943-2009). The term "science wars" was coined for a special 1996 issue of Social Text, a Duke University Press publication of postmodern critical theory, that featured multiple articles emphasizing the social construction of scientific knowledge. The dispute gained significant media interest because of the Sokal hoax, which generated unusually wide public interest and transformed what had been a specialized academic debate into a broader public controversy.

== See also ==
- Academic careerism – Tendency of academics to put career over truth
- Cliodynamics – Mathematical modeling of historical processes
- Economics of scientific knowledge
- Historiography of science – History and analysis of the history of science
- Paradigm shift – Fundamental change in ideas and practices within a scientific discipline
- Philosophy of social science – Study of the logic, methods, and foundations of social sciences
- Public awareness of science – Aspect of education and communication
- Science studies – Research area analyzing scientific expertise
- Science and technology studies – Academic field
- Scientific community metaphor
- Social constructionism – Sociological theory regarding shared understandings
- Social construction of technology – Theory in science and technology studies
- Sociology of knowledge – Study of the relationship between thought, social context, and consequences for society
- Sociology of quantification
- Sociology of scientific ignorance – Study of ignorance in science
- Sociology of the history of science – Diachronically-comparative sociological analysis of scienticity
- Technology and society

Disputes:

- Bogdanov affair – 2002 French academic dispute
- Sokal affair – 1996 scholarly publishing sting accepted by an academic journal
