= Ernest Braun =

British-Austrian scholar (1925–2015)

Professor Ernest Braun
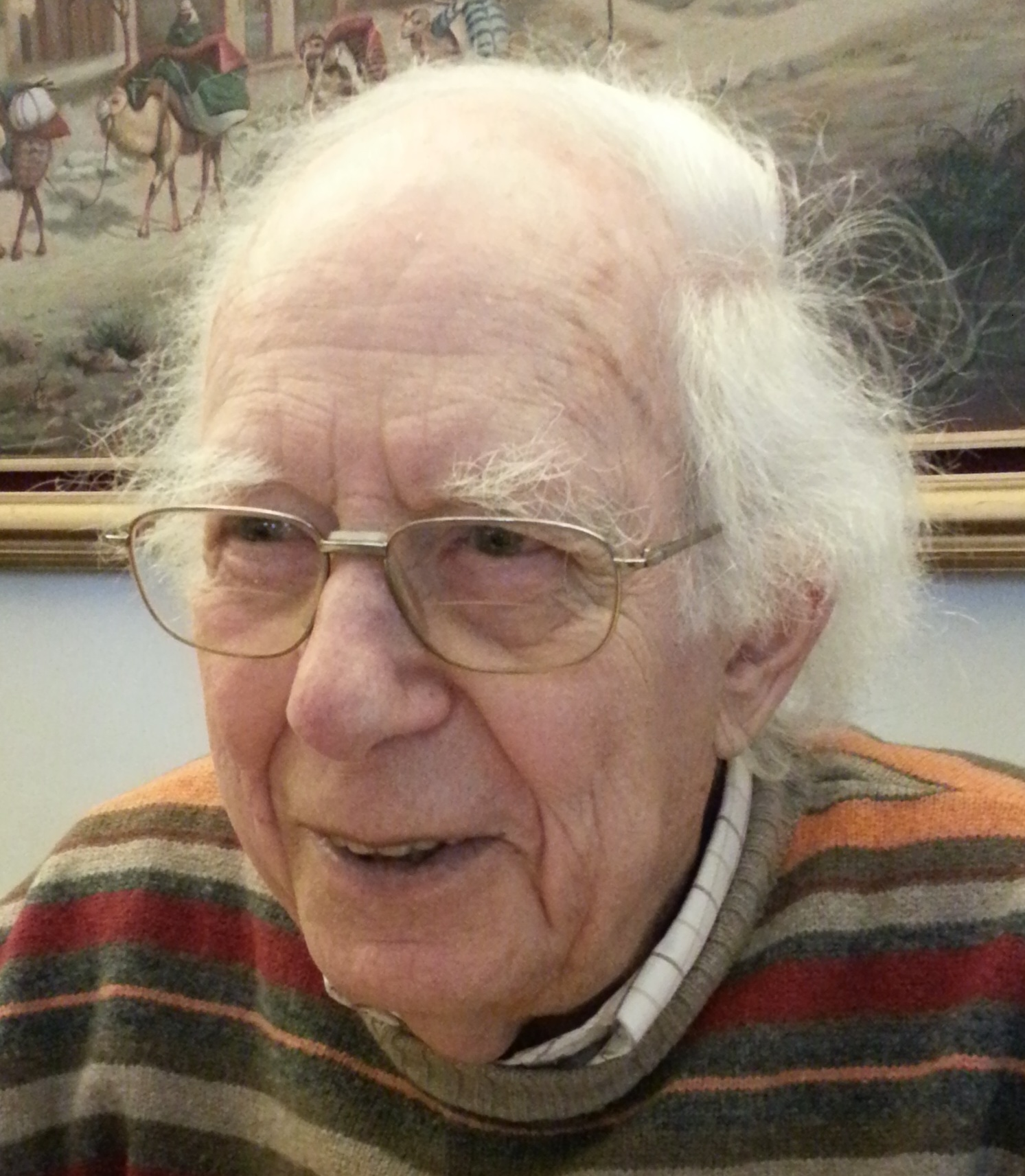
- Braun, on his 88th birthday
- Born: 9 March 1925; Vienna, Austria
- Died: 3 March 2015 (aged 89); Bruckneudorf, Austria
- Other name: Ernst Braun
- Education: Charles University in Prague; Bristol University
- Occupation: Academic physicist

Ernst Braun (9 March 1925 – 3 March 2015) was a British-Austrian scholar in technology policy and technology assessment.

== Biography ==
=== Early life and academic career ===
Born in Vienna as a Czechoslovak citizen, Braun grew up in Czechoslovakia. He studied physics at Charles University in Prague (1952 MSc, Dr.rer.nat.) and received a PhD in solid-state physics from Bristol in 1959. After conducting research in an industrial research laboratory, he began an academic career. In 1967, he was appointed professor of physics at Aston University in Birmingham.

=== Technology Policy Unit and SISCON ===
In 1973, Braun established an interdisciplinary postgraduate research unit, the Technology Policy Unit (TPU). Its research encompassed the social aspects of technology, including questions of policy, technology assessment, and the processes and effects of technological innovation.

In the same year, Braun, together with Bill Williams and Michael Gibbons, founded an interuniversity group known as "Science in a Social Context" (SISCON). The group obtained funding and employed research fellows who produced teaching texts published by Butterworth. Its purpose was to assist in the teaching of the social aspects of science and technology to undergraduates in a variety of disciplines.

The TPU at Aston University established an MSc course entitled "Social Aspects of Science and Technology" and also recruited several doctoral students. Many graduates of the doctoral programme later became professors at British universities. David Collingridge, the author of the Collingridge dilemma, also worked at the TPU.

=== Work in Austria ===
In 1982–83, Braun was a visiting professor at Vienna Technical University. In 1984, he retired from Aston University, and became a visiting professor at the University of Vienna, followed by several freelance research projects in Austria.

In 1985, he joined the Austrian Academy of Sciences (OAW), where he established a research group on technology assessment. In 1988, this group became the Technology Assessment Unit (FTB), which he headed until his retirement from the OAW in 1991, when he returned to England. Braun was succeeded by Gunther Tichy, under whose leadership the FTB became the Institute of Technology Assessment (ITA).

=== Later life and death ===
After returning to England, Braun became a visiting professor at the Open University in Milton Keynes. Following his final retirement in 1994, he lived in Portugal for five years. In 2010, he moved to Austria with his wife, Doris (née Luttenberger), a painter. He had two daughters from his first marriage, both of whom lived in London.

Braun died on 3 March 2015 in Bruckneudorf, six days before his 90th birthday.

== Achievements ==
Braun is regarded as a European pioneer of social studies in science and technology in general, and of technology assessment in particular. In Austria he is regarded as the founder of technology assessment. He has written several books and many journal articles. His best known books are probably Revolution in Miniature (with Stuart Macdonald) 1978, Futile Progress 1995, Technology in Context 1998. His last book, From Need to Greed, The Changing Role of Technology in Society, published in 2010.

== Books ==
- Science and Survival, Butterworth, London 1977 (a SISCON book), ISBN 0-408-71313-5 (with David Collingridge).
- Revolution in Miniature. Cambridge University Press, Cambridge 1978, ISBN 0-521-21815-2 (with Stuart McDonald).
- Assessment of Technological Decisions, Butterworth, London 1979 (a SISCON book), ISBN 0-408-71301-1 (with David Collingridge and Kate Hinton)
- Wayward Technology. Printer, London 1984, ISBN 0-86187-288-6.
- Futile Progress, Earthscan, London, 1995, ISBN 1-85383-243-X.
- Technology in Context, Routledge, London, 1998, ISBN 0-415-18342-1.
- From Need to Greed, Austrian Academy of Sciences Press, Vienna, 2010, ISBN 978-3-7001-6916-1.

== Sources ==
This short biography is based on an autographic curriculum vitae by E. Braun as well as research carried out at the Institute of Technology Assessment in Vienna, among others published in this article (in German): Nentwich/Peissl, 2005, 20 Jahre Technikfolgenabschätzung in Österreich. In: Nentwich, Michael; Peissl, Walter (Hrsg.), Technikfolgenabschätzung in der österreichischen Praxis, Festschrift für Gunther Tichy; Wien: Verlag der Österreichischen Akadmie der Wissenschaften, pp. 11–32, ISBN 3-7001-3613-7 PDF; 272 kB. This article is mostly translated from original in the German Wikipedia.

Obituary: "Ernest Braun 1925-2015"
