= European Technology Assessment Group =

logo

The European Technology Assessment Group (ETAG) is a cooperative network of scientific institutions that carries out studies in the field of technology assessment on behalf of the European Parliament.

== History and mission ==
Since October 2005, a group of European scientific institutes active in the field of technology assessment – with the Institute for Technology Assessment and Systems Analysis (ITAS), Karlsruhe Institute of Technology (KIT), Germany, as the leading partner – has been providing scientific services for the European Parliament on social, environmental and economic aspects of new technological and scientific developments.

Like many other parliaments in Europe the European Parliament at the end of the 1980s set up an institution for scientific advice regarding complex social, ecological and economic implications of modern technology and scientific research. At the European Parliament, the process of consulting is organised by the STOA panel (Scientific Technology Options Assessment), a parliamentary body consisting of 15 Members of Parliament representing several parliamentary committees. In view of the growing importance of European science and technology policy the European Parliament decided to support STOA's activities by establishing permanent co-operation with a group of institutions with relevant expertise in the field of technology assessment.

Starting from May 2009, the European Technology Assessment Group (ETAG) for a second period of three years supports STOA by carrying out TA studies. The focus of ETAG's activities on behalf of the European Parliament will be on studies in the fields of transport, ICT and Information society, nanoscale science and technology, life sciences and human well-being as well as agriculture, food and biotechnology.

== Partners ==
Apart from being leading institutions in the field of technology assessment in their home countries most members of the group have long-term experience in policy consulting for parliamentary bodies and most of them are members of the European Parliamentary Technology Assessment (EPTA) network. ETAG is made up by the following organisations:

- Institute for Technology Assessment and Systems Analysis (ITAS), Karlsruhe Institute of Technology (KIT), which operates the Office of Technology Assessment at the German Parliament
- Danish Board of Technology (DBT), which provides consultancy services for the Danish Parliament
- Rathenau Instituut, working for the Dutch Parliament
- Fraunhofer Institute for Systems and Innovation Research (ISI), supporting ITAS in carrying out TA studies on behalf of the German Parliament
- Catalan Foundation for Research and Innovation (FCRI), rendering scientific services for the Parliament of Catalonia
- Institute of Technology Assessment (ITA) of the Austrian Academy of Sciences
- Technology Centre AS CR, an institute active in TA related research run by the Academy of Sciences of the Czech Republic
- Responsible Technology SAS, a French consultancy devoted to Responsible Research and Innovation (RRI) and Anticipatory Governance

== Projects ==
The scientific responsibility for each TA study tailored according to the information needs of the European Parliament lies with one of the partners. ITAS is responsible for administration, communication with the European Parliament and co-ordination of the activities of ETAG as well as of the group's co-operation with a wider network of TA institutes in Europe. The work programme comprises studies dealing with a broad range of subjects from different sectors of policy making, such as R&D, the environment, health and energy. Topics included: Converging Technologies; Antibiotic Resistance; Galileo Applications; Sustainable Energy Catalogue; Nanotechnology and Chemical Substitution; Options for Road and Air Transports; Cancer Therapy; RFID an identity management; Intellectual Property Rights; Global Human Health; Future Energy Systems in Europe; Future of European Transport; Technology and the Labour Market; Safety of Tunnels; Direct to Consumer Genetic Testing; Animal Welfare; Human Enhancement; ICT and Energy Efficiency; Agricultural Technologies for Developing Countries.

Studies carried out by ETAG on behalf of STOA are available at STOA's web page.
