= Emine Bozkurt =

Dutch politician of Turkish descent

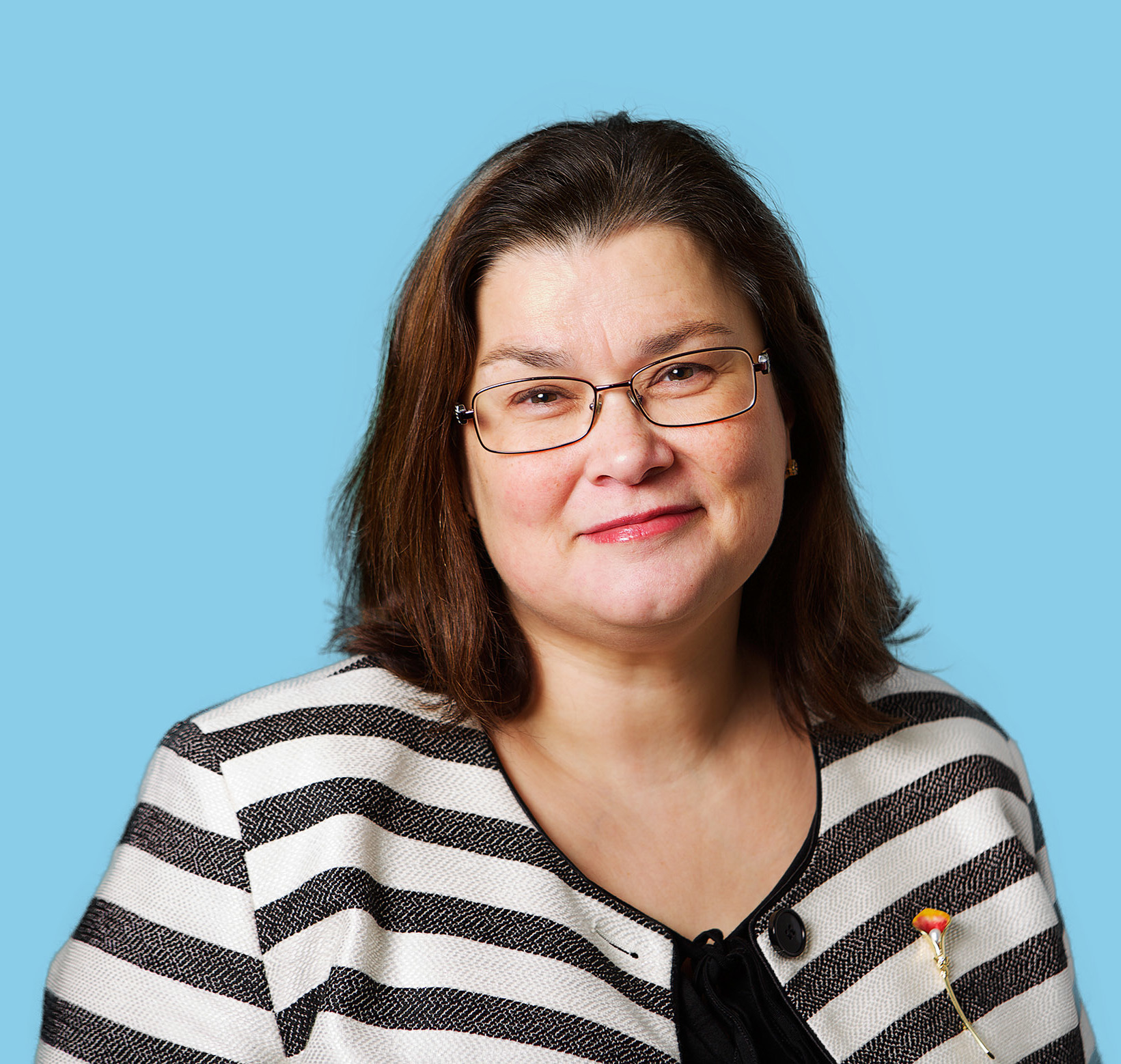
- Emine Bozkurt in 2016

Member of the European Parliament
- In office 20 July 2004 – 1 July 2014
- Constituency: Netherlands

Personal details
- Born: 9 August 1967 (age 59) Zaandam, Netherlands
- Party: Labour Party
- Education: University of Amsterdam

Emine Bozkurt (born 9 August 1967) is a Dutch politician of Turkish descent and Member of the European Parliament between 2004 and 2014. She is a member of the Dutch Labour Party, which is part of the Party of European Socialists.

In the European Parliament she was a member of the Committee on Civil Liberties, Justice and Home Affairs and the Committee on Women's Rights and Gender Equality. Furthermore, she was the chairperson of the Delegation for Relations with the Countries of Central America, as well as a substitute member of the Committee on Foreign Affairs.

== Early life ==
Emine Bozkurt was born in Zaandam, North Holland to a Dutch mother and a Turkish father. She currently lives in Zaandam and Brussels.

== Education ==
- Bachelor's degree in French Language and Literature, University of Amsterdam (1987)
- Master's degree in European Studies, University of Amsterdam (1992)

== Career ==
- Staff member of the consulate-general, Germany (1992–1993)
- Spokeswoman and head of internal and external relations, Dutch Muslim Broadcasting Company (1993–1997)
- Publisher and spokeswoman, Rathenau Institute (1997–2001)
- Senior adviser, Radar - advice bureau on social issues (2001–2004)
- Member of the Amsterdam PvdA executive (1998–1999)
- Member of the PvdA European policy advisory committee (since 1999)
- Member of the core group of the PvdA multi-ethnic women's network (1997–2001)
- Member of the review committee on public broadcasting (Rinnooy-Kan Committee) (2002–2003)
- Member of the disputes committee of the National Committee for International Cooperation and Sustainable Development (NCDO) (since 2002)
- Member of the governing body of the Institute for Public and Politics (civic education)

=== Member of the European Parliament ===
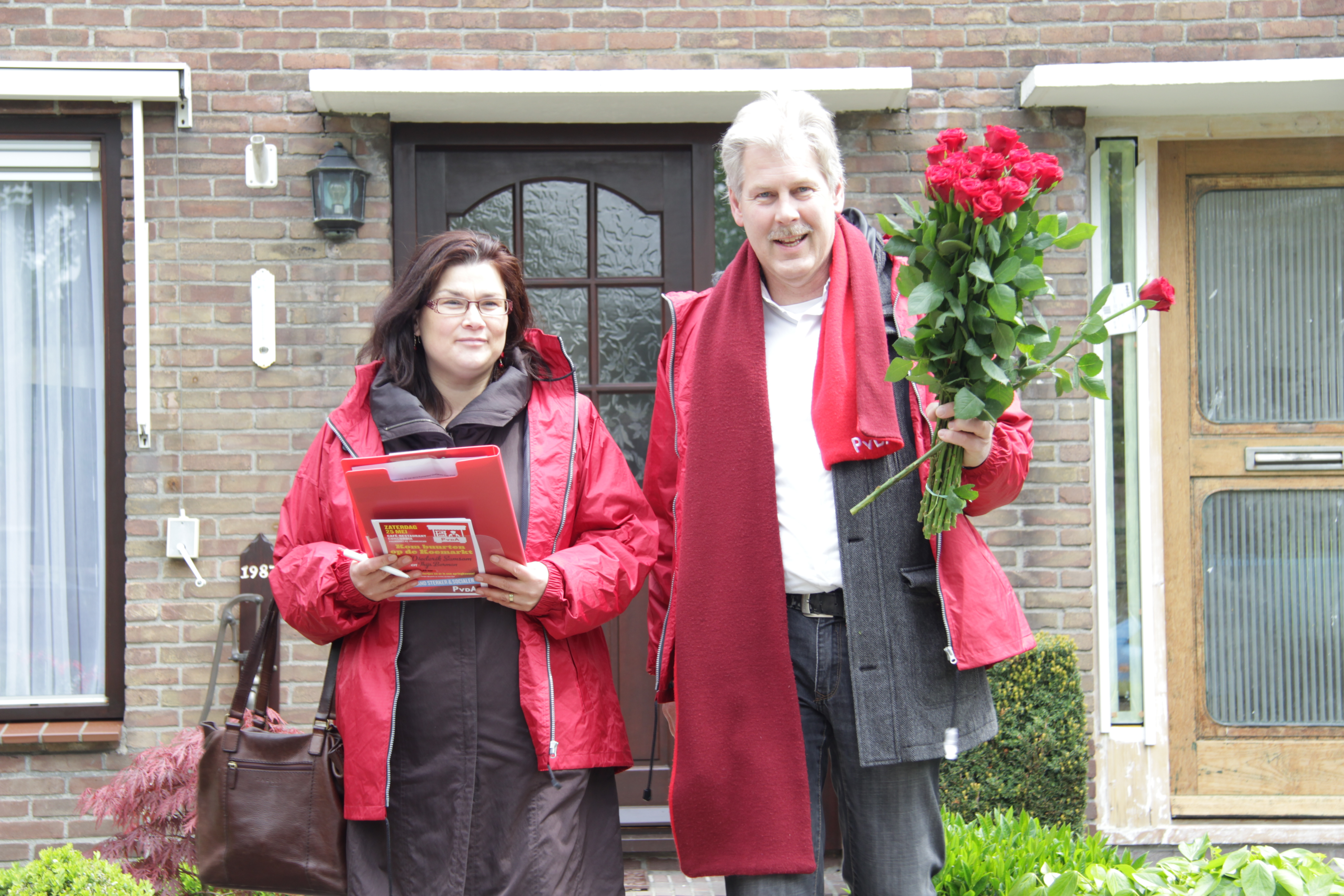
Emine Bozkurt campaigning for the Labour Party

During her terms, Bozkurt was involved in the following committees:

- Chairperson delegation for relations with the countries of Central America (2009–2014)
- Committee on Civil Liberties, Justice and Home Affairs (2009–2014)
- Committee on Women's Rights and Gender Equality (2004–2014)
- Special committee on organised crime, corruption and money laundering (2012–2013)
- Delegation to the Euro-Latin American Parliamentary Assembly (2009–2014)
- Substitute member Committee on Foreign Affairs (2009–2012)
- Substitute member of the Delegation to the EU-Turkey Joint Parliamentary Committee (2009–2013)
- Chairperson of the Friends of Football
- Chairperson of the Friends of Bosnia and Herzegovina
- Chairperson of the Anti-Racism and Diversity Intergroup
- Member of Intergroup for Lesbian, Gay, Bisexual and Transgender (LGBT) rights
- Member of the Committee on Employment and Social Affairs (2004–2009)
- Member of the Committee on Culture and Education (2004–2009)
- Member of the delegation to the EU-Turkey Joint Parliamentary Committee (2004–2009)
