= Social shaping of technology =

Theory in science and technology studies

Social shaping of technology (SST) is the concept that there are choices (though not necessarily conscious choices) inherent in both the design of individual artifacts and systems, and in the direction or trajectory of innovation programs.

If technology does not emerge from the unfolding of a predetermined logic or a single determinant, then innovation is a 'garden of forking paths'. Different routes are available, potentially leading to different technological outcomes. Significantly, these choices could have differing implications for society and for particular social groups.

SST is one of the models of the technology: society relationship which emerged in the 1980s with MacKenzie and Wajcman's influential 1985 collection, alongside Pinch and Bijker's social construction of technology framework and Callon and Latour's actor-network theory. These have a common feature of criticism of the linear model of innovation and technological determinism. It differs from these notably in the attention it pays to the influence of the social and technological context of development which shapes innovation choices. SST is concerned to explore the material consequences of different technical choices, but criticizes technological determinism, which argues that technology follows its own developmental path, outside of human influences, and in turn, influences society. In this way, social shaping theorists conceive the relationship between technology and society as one of 'mutual shaping'.

Some versions of this theory state that technology affects society by affordances, constraints, preconditions, and unintended consequences (Baym, 2015). Affordance is the idea that technology makes specific tasks easier in our lives, while constraints make tasks harder to complete. The preconditions of technology are the skills and resources that are vital to using technology to its fullest potential. Finally, the unintended consequences of technology are unanticipated effects and impact of technology. The cell phone is an example of the social shaping of technology (Zulto 2009). The cell phone has evolved over the years to make our lives easier by providing people with handheld computers that can answer calls, answer emails, search for information, and complete numerous other tasks (Zulto, 2009). Yet it has constraints for those that are not technologically savvy, hindering many people in society who do not understand how to utilize these devices. There are preconditions, such as monthly bills and access to electricity. There are also many unintended consequences such as the unintended distraction they cause for many people.

Not only does technology affect society, but according to SST, society affects technology by way of economics, politics, and culture (Baym, 2015). For instance, cell phones have spread in poor countries due to cell phones being more affordable than a computer and internet service (economics), government regulations which have made it fairly easy for cell phone providers to build networks (politics), and the small size of cell phones which fit easily into many cultures’ need for mobile communication (culture).

== Names associated with this field ==
Donald A. MacKenzie, Judy Wajcman, Bruno Latour, Wiebe Bijker, Thomas P. Hughes, John Law, Trevor Pinch (also Trevor J. Pinch), Michel Callon, Steve Woolgar, Carl May, Thomas J. Misa, Boelie Elzen, Robin Williams (academic), Ronald R. Kline, Marlei Pozzebon, and Osman Sadeck

== See also ==
- Normalization process theory (NPT)
- Science and technology studies
- Science studies
- Social construction of technology (SCOT)
- Technological revolution
- Technology and society
