= Social construction of technology =

Theory in science and technology studies

Social construction of technology (SCOT) is a theory within the field of science and technology studies. Advocates of SCOT—that is, social constructivists—argue that technology does not determine human action; rather, human action shapes technology. Additionally, they also argue that the ways a technology is used cannot be understood without a thorough understanding of how that technology is embedded within its respective social context. SCOT is a response to technological determinism, and it is sometimes known as technological constructivism.

SCOT draws from the contributions of constructivist school of the sociology of scientific knowledge, and its subtopics include actor-network theory (a branch of the sociology of science and technology) and historical analysis of sociotechnical systems, such as the work of historian Thomas P. Hughes. Its empirical methods are an adaptation of the Empirical Programme of Relativism (EPOR), which outlines a method of analysis to demonstrate the ways in which scientific findings are socially constructed (see strong program). Leading adherents of SCOT include Wiebe Bijker and Trevor Pinch.

SCOT holds that those who seek to understand the reasons for acceptance or rejection of a technology, should look to the social world. According to SCOT, a mere assertion of a technology's preeminence as "the best" is insufficient to explain its success. Researchers must examine the criteria that define "the best" and the groups and stakeholders involved in its definition. In particular, they must ask who defines the technical criteria success is measured by, why technical criteria are defined this way, and who is included or excluded. Pinch and Bijker argue that technological determinism is a myth that results when one looks backwards and believes that the path taken to the present was the only possible path.

SCOT is not only a theory, but also a methodology: it formalizes the steps and principles to follow when one wants to analyze the causes of technological failures or successes.

== Legacy of the Strong Programme in the sociology of science ==
At the point of its conception, the SCOT approach was partly motivated by the ideas of the strong programme in the sociology of science. In their seminal article, Pinch and Bijker refer to the Principle of Symmetry as the most influential tenet of the Sociology of Science, which should be applied in historical and sociological investigations of technology as well. It is strongly connected to Bloor's theory of social causation.

=== Symmetry ===
The Principle of Symmetry holds that in explaining the origins of scientific beliefs, that is, assessing the success and failure of models, theories, or experiments, the historian/sociologist should deploy the same kind of explanation in the cases of success as in cases of failure. When investigating beliefs, researchers should be impartial to the (a posteriori attributed) truth or falsehood of those beliefs, and the explanations should be unbiased. The strong programme adopts a position of relativism or neutralism regarding the arguments that social actors put forward for the acceptance/rejection of any technology. All arguments (social, cultural, political, economic, as well as technical) are to be treated equally.

The symmetry principle addresses the problem that the historian is tempted to explain the success of successful theories by referring to their "objective truth", or inherent "technical superiority", whereas s/he is more likely to put forward sociological explanations (citing political influence or economic reasons) only in the case of failures. For example, having experienced the obvious success of the chain-driven bicycle for decades, it is tempting to attribute its success to its "advanced technology" compared to the "primitiveness" of the Penny Farthing, but if we look closely and symmetrically at their history (as Pinch and Bijker do), we can see that at the beginning bicycles were valued according to quite different standards than nowadays. The early adopters (predominantly young, well-to-do gentlemen) valued the speed, the thrill, and the spectacularity of the Penny Farthing – in contrast to the security and stability of the chain-driven Safety Bicycle. Many other social factors (e.g., the contemporary state of urbanism and transport, women's clothing habits and feminism) have influenced and changed the relative valuations of bicycle models.

A weak reading of the Principle of Symmetry points out that there often are many competing theories or technologies, which all have the potential to provide slightly different solutions to similar problems. In these cases, sociological factors tip the balance between them: that's why we should pay equal attention to them.

A strong, social constructivist reading would add that even the emergence of the questions or problems to be solved are governed by social determinations, so the Principle of Symmetry is applicable even to the apparently purely technical issues.

== Original Core concepts ==
The Empirical Programme of Relativism (EPOR) introduced the SCOT theory in two stage.

=== First Stage: Interpretative flexibility ===
The first stage of the SCOT research methodology is to reconstruct the alternative interpretations of the technology, analyze the problems and conflicts these interpretations give rise to, and connect them to the design features of the technological artifacts. The relations between groups, problems, and designs can be visualized in diagrams.

Interpretative flexibility means that each technological artifact has different meanings and interpretations for various groups. Bijker and Pinch show that the air tire of the bicycle meant a more convenient mode of transportation for some people, whereas it meant technical nuisances, traction problems and ugly aesthetics to others. In racing air tires lent to greater speed.

These alternative interpretations generate different problems to be solved. For the bicycle, it means how features such as aesthetics, convenience, and speed should be prioritized. It also considers tradeoffs, such as between traction and speed.

==== Relevant social groups ====
The most basic relevant groups are the users and the producers of the technological artifact, but most often many subgroups can be delineated – users with different socioeconomic status, competing producers, etc. Sometimes there are relevant groups who are neither users, nor producers of the technology, for example, journalists, politicians, and civil organizations. Trevor Pinch has argued that the salespeople of technology should also be included in the study of technology. The groups can be distinguished based on their shared or diverging interpretations of the technology in question.

==== Design flexibility ====
Just as technologies have different meanings in different social groups, there are always multiple ways of constructing technologies. A particular design is only a single point in the large field of technical possibilities, reflecting the interpretations of certain relevant groups.

==== Problems and conflicts ====
The different interpretations often give rise to conflicts between criteria that are hard to resolve technologically (e.g., in the case of the bicycle, one such problem was how a woman could ride the bicycle in a skirt while still adhering to standards of decency), or conflicts between the relevant groups (the "Anti-cyclists" lobbied for the banning of the bicycles). Different groups in different societies construct different problems, leading to different designs.

=== Second Stage: Closure ===
The second stage of the SCOT methodology is to show how closure is achieved.

Over time, as technologies are developed, the interpretative and design flexibility collapse through closure mechanisms. Two examples of closure mechanisms:

1. Rhetorical closure: When social groups see the problem as being solved, the need for alternative designs diminishes. This is often the result of advertising.
2. Redefinition of the problem: A design standing in the focus of conflicts can be stabilized by using it to solve a different, new problem, which ends up being solved by this very design. As an example, the aesthetic and technical problems of the air tire diminished, as the technology advanced to the stage where air tire bikes started to win the bike races. Tires were still considered cumbersome and ugly, but they provided a solution to the "speed problem", and this overrode previous concerns.

Closure is not permanent. New social groups may form and reintroduce interpretative flexibility, causing a new round of debate or conflict about a technology. (For instance, in the 1890s automobiles were seen as the "green" alternative, a cleaner environmentally-friendly technology, to horse-powered vehicles; by the 1960s, new social groups had introduced new interpretations about the environmental effects of the automobile, eliciting the opposite conclusion.)

== Subsequent extension of the SCOT theory ==
Many other historians and sociologists of technology extended the original SCOT theory.

=== Relating the content of the technological artifact to the wider sociopolitical milieu ===
This is often considered the third stage of the original theory.

For example, Paul N. Edwards shows in his book "The Closed World: Computers and the Politics of Discourse in Cold War America" the strong relations between the political discourse of the Cold War and the computer designs of this era.

== Criticism ==
In 1993, Langdon Winner published a critique of SCOT entitled "Upon Opening the Black Box and Finding it Empty: Social Constructivism and the Philosophy of Technology." In it, he argues that social constructivism is an overly narrow research program. He identifies the following specific limitations in social constructivism:

1. It explains how technologies arise, but ignores the consequences of the technologies after the fact. This results in a sociology that says nothing about how such technologies matter in the broader context.
2. It examines social groups and interests that contribute to the construction of technology, but ignores those who have no voice in the process, yet are affected by it. Likewise, when documenting technological contingencies and choices, it fails to account for those options that never made it to the table. According to Winner, this results in conservative and elitist sociology.
3. It is superficial in that it focuses on how the immediate needs, interests, problems and solutions of chosen social groups influence technological choice, but disregards any possible deeper cultural, intellectual or economic origins of social choices concerning technology.
4. It actively avoids taking any kind of moral stance or passing judgment on the relative merits of the alternative interpretations of a technology. This indifference makes it unhelpful in addressing important debates about the place of technology in human affairs.

Other critics include Stewart Russell with his letter in the journal Social Studies of Science titled "The Social Construction of Artifacts: A Response to Pinch and Bijker".

Deborah Deliyannis, Hendrik Dey, and Paolo Squatriti criticize the concept of social construction of technology for being a false dichotomy with a technologically determinist straw man that ignores third, fourth and more alternatives, as well as for overlooking the process of how the technology is developed as something that can work. For example, accounting for which groups would have interests in a windmill cannot explain how a windmill is practically constructed, nor does it account for the difference between having the knowledge but for some reason not using it and lacking the knowledge altogether. This distinction between knowledge that have not yet been invented and knowledge that is merely prevented from being used by commercial, bureaucratic or other socially constructed factors, which it is argued that SCOT overlooks, is argued to explain the archaeological evidence of rich technological cultures in the aftermath of the collapse of civilizations (such as early medieval technology in the aftermath of the collapse of the Roman Empire, which was much richer than it is depicted as by the "Dark Medieval" stereotype) as a result of technology being remembered even when prevented from being used with the potential to being put into use when the artificial repression is no longer in place due to societal collapse.

== See also ==
- History of science and technology
- Industrial sociology
- Science and technology studies (STS)
- Social shaping of technology
- Sociocultural evolution
- Sociology of scientific knowledge
- Systems theory
- Technology and society
- Technology dynamics
- Theories of technology
