= The Effects of Nuclear War =

- Title page for The Effects of Nuclear War (1978)
- Subject: Nuclear warfare
- Publisher: Office of Technology Assessment
- Publication date: 1978
- Website: https://archive.org/details/effectsofnuclear00unit/mode/2up

The Effects of Nuclear War is a 1978 book commissioned by the United States Office of Technology Assessment to support civilian preparation for nuclear warfare. The book argued that the social effects of a nuclear attack would be unpredictable, and also, that the welfare of society would worsen for years after the attack.

== "Charlottesville: A Fictional Account" ==
An essay, written by Nan Randall, entitled "Charlottesville: A Fictional Account", presented a nonfiction-style description of the catastrophic indirect effects of a nuclear attack on Charlottesville, Virginia following a nuclear attack on Washington DC. In the near term, the US, the government of which still exists, faces an uncertain future.

"Charlottesville" came to be popular on its own, separated from the full government report. It was an inspiration for the 1983 TV movie, The Day After. The story is in the public domain.
