= EPTA =

EPTA may refer to:

- European Parliamentary Technology Assessment
- European Pulsar Timing Array
- Phosphotungstic acid
- Expanded Programme of Technical Assistance, a United Nations aid network
- European Piano Teachers Association
- Eastern Panhandle Transit Authority
