= Urs Luterbacher =

Swiss political scientist

Urs Luterbacher (born November 5, 1944) is a Swiss political scientist who applies models and game theory to international conflict and cooperation and international environmental problems. He is a co-editor of the 2001 volume International Relations and Global Climate Change.

After graduating from high school in Biel, Luterbacher studied political science at the University of Geneva and, after a period as a research assistant at the University of Michigan, received his doctorate in 1974 from the Graduate Institute of International Studies in Geneva. From 1977 to 2010 he was a professor at the same institute (since 2008, Graduate Institute of International Studies and Development, IHEID). In 1984 he was a visiting professor at the University of Nebraska–Lincoln, and from 1990 to 1991 at the University of Michigan.

Luterbacher is a member of ProClim, the forum for climate and global environmental change of the Swiss Academies of Arts and Sciences.
