= Nihal Kularatna =

Sri-lankan electronics engineer (born 1954)

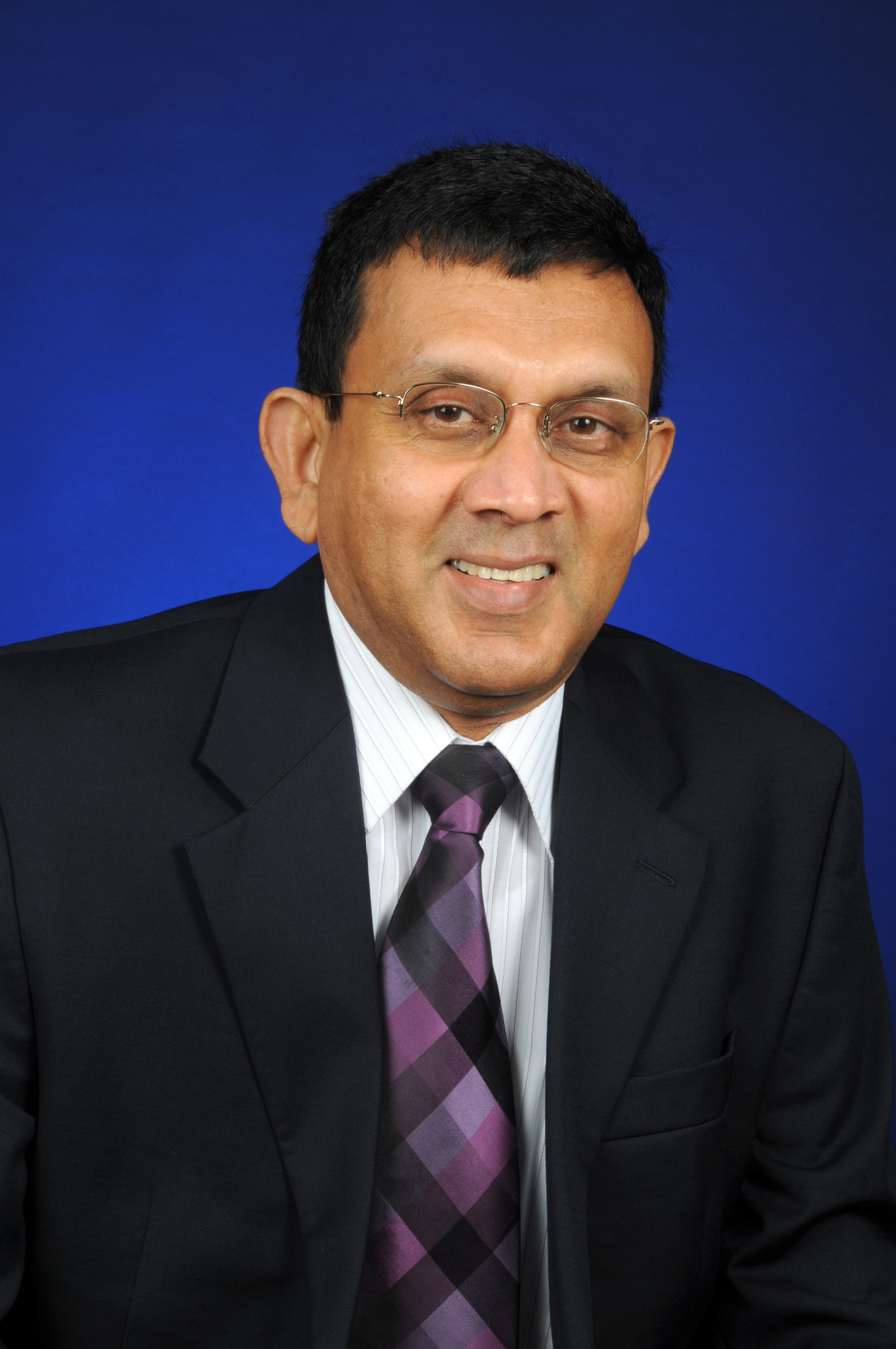
- Kularatna in 2011
- Born: 1954 (age 71–72); Colombo, Sri Lanka
- Education: University of Ceylon (B.Sc Eng.); The University of Waikato (D.Sc)
- Scientific career
- Workplaces: University of Waikato

Nihal Kularatna is a Sri Lankan electronics engineer. He serves as professor at University of Waikato. He has over four and a half decades of contributions to both electronics research. In 2014 he was appointed the Vice Chair of the IEEE DC Energy Efficiency Committee. His research output includes over 160 refereed papers published in esteemed journals and presented at international conferences.

== Education ==
He holds a Doctor of Science (DSc) degree from the University of Waikato, and a Bachelor of Science in engineering (Honors) from the University of Ceylon.

== Career ==
During the period spanning 1985 to 2002, Kularatna joined the Arthur C Clarke Institute for Modern Technologies, he engaged in industrial research and spearheaded the development of continuous professional development training programs tailored for practicing engineers and also held the position of CEO within the organization.

In addition to his institutional roles, Kularatna served as a consultant for various US companies, including the Gartner Group and Technology Dynamics, NJ. In 2002, he moved to New Zealand, accepting a senior lecturer position at the Department of Electrical and Computer Engineering at The University of Auckland. Subsequently, in 2006, he transitioned to the University of Waikato.

His research output includes over 160 refereed papers published in journals and presented at international conferences.

He was awarded with the UoW Postgraduate Research Supervision Excellence Award in 2021. He won the New Zealand Engineering Innovator of the year 2013.

Currently serving as Professor in Electronics at the University of Waikato, School of Engineering, Kularatna's research interests include supercapacitor applications electronic engineering, surge protection, power electronics, sensors. He is a Contributing Editor (Book reviews) for IEEE Electrical Insulation Magazine.

== Early life and career ==
Kularatna grew up on the southern coast of Sri Lanka, including the town of Ambalangoda, and attended school in Colombo. He entered the Faculty of Engineering of the University of Ceylon at Peradeniya in 1972 and graduated in electrical engineering in 1976.

In 1976 he joined the Department of Civil Aviation of Sri Lanka as an electronics engineer at the Area Control Centre at Ratmalana Airport. There he maintained an Alcatel computerised message-switching system, after five months of training at an Alcatel subsidiary in Paris. He later installed VOR/DME navigational aids at Sri Lankan airfields, including a new installation at the country's international airport before Elizabeth II's visit in 1981. His training for this work took place in the United States, the United Kingdom and France.

Alongside his aviation work, Kularatna designed circuits in a home laboratory, mainly linear power supplies. A bench power supply design that used a zener diode in its leakage region to provide foldback current limiting became his first international publication. It appeared in the design ideas pages of the British magazine Electronic Engineering in June 1978. Further designs were published in the American magazine Electronics in 1980 and 1981. The 1980 article was reprinted in McGraw-Hill's Electronic Circuits Notebook.

From 1982 to 1985 he worked in the Middle East as an engineer on digital telecommunications systems, including Ericsson AXE digital telephone exchanges.

He returned to Sri Lanka in late 1985 and joined the Arthur C. Clarke Institute for Modern Technologies as a research and development engineer. Arthur C. Clarke, the institute's patron, encouraged him to publish his work internationally and wrote the preface to his first book. Clarke also introduced him to John R. Pierce, who advised him on writing technical books. In 1988 he published a low-cost, fast-acting solid-state AC voltage regulator for supply lines with large voltage fluctuations. He became CEO of the institute in 1999.

== Pioneering Supercapacitor Assisted (SCA) Techniques ==
Nihal Kularatna led a research group the University of Waikato in Hamilton, New Zealand within the two decades (2005-2025) to develop a new family of supercapacitor applications emerged and known as Supercapacitor Assisted (SCA) techniques. These SCA techniques family includes unique types of DC-DC converters, lightning protection systems, DC circuit breakers and DC powered appliances such as white goods etc. These techniques has culminated several patents, research publications and some commercial products such as Prodigy 8 series.

Supercapacitor assisted low dropout regulator (SCALDO) is the first successful power converter technique under the SCA family. Supercapacitor assisted surge absorber (SCASA) is the first supercapacitor based surge protector technique which was commercialized by Thor Technologies, Perth, Australia. Supercapacitor assisted LED (SCALED) technique is a high efficiency DC lighting technique aimed at DC grid based future buildings.With future DC microgrid based DC systems developing, SCA Transient Energy Pump (SCATEP) based DC circuit breaker technique was also recently developed.

SCA techniques are based on a new theoretical concept now published as SCA Loss Management (SCALoM)theoryand this new family of power converters and protection systems are aimed at future DC microgrids, DC homes and DC appliances based on renewable energy.

== Contribution of books ==
Nihal has shared his electronic engineering expertise by authoring many reference books for electronic engineers starting in 1996. His first work on electronic test and measuring instruments was published in 1996 by the Institution of Engineering Technology – London, which was formerly known as IEE-London. In 1998, he published a book with Elsevier titled Power Electronics Design Handbook: Low Power Components and Applications. This was followed by another work in 2000 for Elsevier titled Modern Component Families and Circuit Block Design. In 2003, a new edition of his first book was published as Digital and Analogue Instrumentation: Testing and Measurement. It was reprinted in 2008 by IET-London. His fifth work, co-authored, on telecommunications was published in 2004 by Artech House Publishers.

With CRC Press, he contributed two works in 2008 and 2012 respectively: Circuit Design and DC Power Management. From 2014 to 2021, he published three research monographs with Elsevier: on energy storage devices, transient surge protector design, and his latest monograph, Energy Storage Devices for Renewable Energy Systems: Rechargeable Batteries and Supercapacitors. These ten works collectively span over 4,000 printed pages.

== Selected publications ==
- Kularatna, Nihal; Sudantha, B. H. (April 2008). "An Environmental Air Pollution Monitoring System Based on the IEEE 1451 Standard for Low Cost Requirements". IEEE Sensors Journal. 8 (4): 415–422. Bibcode:2008ISenJ...8..415K. doi:10.1109/JSEN.2008.917477.
- Arawwawala, Nadee; Kularatna, Nihal; Sirimanne, Don Charles Uvindra (September 2023). "Future Directions of Commercially Available Supercapacitors". IEEE Power Electronics Magazine. 10 (3): 52–60. doi:10.1109/MPEL.2023.3303103.
- Ariyarathna, Thilanga; Kularatna, Nihal; Gunawardane, Kosala; Jayananda, Dilini; Steyn-Ross, David Alistair (2021). "Development of Supercapacitor Technology and Its Potential Impact on New Power Converter Techniques for Renewable Energy". IEEE Journal of Emerging and Selected Topics in Industrial Electronics. 2 (3): 267–276. Bibcode:2021IJEIE...2..267A. doi:10.1109/JESTIE.2021.3061962. ISSN 2687-9735.
- Arawwawala, N.; Kularatna, Nihal; Sirimanne, D.C.U. (2023). "Future Directions of Commercially Available Supercapacitors". IEEE Power Electronics Magazine. 10 (3): 52–60. doi:10.1109/MPEL.2023.3303103.
- Sirimanne, D.C.U.; Kularatna, Nihal; Arawwawala, N. (2023). "Electrical Performance of Current Commercial Supercapacitors and Their Future Applications". Electronics. 12 (2465): 2465. doi:10.3390/electronics12112465. hdl:10289/16833.
- Kularatna, Nihal (2023). "Power Conditioning and Power Protection for Electronic Systems". Energies. 16 (2671): 2671. doi:10.3390/en16062671. hdl:10289/16832.
- Thotabaddadurage, S.U.S.; Kularatna, Nihal; Steyn-Ross, David A. (2023). "Permeance Based Design and Analysis of Supercapacitor Assisted Surge Absorber for Magnetic Component Selection". IEEE Transactions on Industrial Electronics. 70 (4): 3593–3603. Bibcode:2023ITIE...70.3593T. doi:10.1109/TIE.2022.3172769.
- Thotabaddadurage, S.S.; Kularatna, Nihal; Steyn-Ross, David A. (2023). "Importance of Leakage Magnetic Field and Fringing Flux in Surge Protector Design". IEEE Transactions on Industry Applications. 59 (1): 289–299. Bibcode:2023IOJIA..59..289T. doi:10.1109/TIA.2022.3208920.
- Fernando, J.; Kularatna, Nihal; Silva, S.; Thotabaddadurage, S.S. (2022). "Supercapacitor Assisted Surge Absorber Technique: High-Performance Transient Surge Protectors for Consumer Electronics". IEEE Power Electronics Magazine. 9 (2): 48–60. doi:10.1109/MPEL.2022.3171644.
- Thotabaddadurage, S.S.U.; Kularatna, Nihal; Steyn-Ross, David A. (2022). "Permeance Based Design and Analysis of Supercapacitor Assisted Surge Absorber for Magnetic Component Selection". IEEE Transactions on Industrial Electronics. 70 (4): 3593–3603. Bibcode:2023ITIE...70.3593T. doi:10.1109/TIE.2022.3172769.
- Subasinghage, K.W.; Gunawardane, K.; Kularatna, Nihal (2022). "Supercapacitor-Assisted Low-Dropout Regulator Technique for Low Output Ripple DC-DC Conversion". IEEE Journal of Emerging and Selected Topics in Industrial Electronics. 3 (4): 1028–1037. Bibcode:2022IJEIE...3.1028S. doi:10.1109/JESTIE.2022.3149708.
- Kularatna, Nihal; Subasinghage, K.; Gunawardane, K.; Jayananda, D.; Ariyarathna, T. (2021). "Supercapacitor-Assisted Techniques and Supercapacitor-Assisted Loss Management Concept: New Design Approaches to Change the Roadmap of Power Conversion Systems". Electronics (Switzerland). 10 (14): 17.
- Silva, T.S.U.; Kularatna, Nihal; Steyn-Ross, David A. (2021). "Optimization of Supercapacitor Assisted Surge Absorber (SCASA) Technique: A New Approach to Improve Surge Endurance Using Air-Gapped Ferrite Cores". Energies. 10 (14): 21.
- Ariyarathna, Thilanga; Kularatna, Nihal; Gunawardane, Kosala; Jayananda, Dilini; Steyn-Ross, David Alistair (2021). "Development of Supercapacitor Technology and Its Potential Impact on New Power Converter Techniques for Renewable Energy". IEEE Journal of Emerging and Selected Topics in Industrial Electronics. 2 (3): 267–276. Bibcode:2021IJEIE...2..267A. doi:10.1109/JESTIE.2021.3061962. ISSN 2687-9735.
- Gunawardane, K.; Bandara, N.; Subasinghage, K.; Kularatna, Nihal (2021). "Extending the Input Voltage Range of Solar PV Inverters with Supercapacitor Energy Circulation". Electronics (Switzerland). 10 (88): 17.
- Subasinghage, K.; Gunawardane, K.; Kularatna, Nihal (2020). "Stability Analysis and Experimental Validation of the Supercapacitor-Assisted Low-Dropout (SCALDO) Regulator". IET Power Electronics. 13 (15): 3213–3225. doi:10.1049/iet-pel.2019.1601. hdl:10289/14253.
- Wijesooriya, P.N.; Kularatna, Nihal; Steyn-Ross, David A. (2020). "Efficiency Enhancement to a Linear AC Voltage Regulator: Multi-Winding Versus Multi-Transformer Design". IEEE Journal of Emerging and Selected Topics in Industrial Electronics. 1 (2): 192–199. Bibcode:2020IJEIE...1..192W. doi:10.1109/JESTIE.2020.3003350. hdl:10289/16187.
- Kularatna, Nihal; Jayananda, D. (2020). "Supercapacitor Based Long Time Constant Circuits: A Unique Design Opportunity for New Power Electronic Circuit Topologies". IEEE Industrial Electronics Magazine. 14 (2): 40–56. Bibcode:2020IIEM...14b..40K. doi:10.1109/MIE.2019.2959199.
- Jayananda, D.; Kularatna, Nihal; Steyn-Ross, David A. (2020). "Supercapacitor-Assisted LED (SCALED) Technique for Renewable Energy Systems: A Very Low Frequency Design Approach with Short-Term DC-UPS Capability Eliminating Battery Banks". IET Renewable Power Generation. 14 (9): 1559–1570. Bibcode:2020IRPG...14.1559J. doi:10.1049/iet-rpg.2019.1307. hdl:10289/16841.
- Subasinghage, K.; Gunawardane, K.; Kularatna, Nihal; Lie, T.K. (2019). "Extending the Supercapacitor-Assisted Low-Dropout Regulator (SCALDO) Technique to a Split-Rail DC–DC Converter Application". IEEE Access. 7: 124034–124047. Bibcode:2019IEEEA...7l4034S. doi:10.1109/ACCESS.2019.2937754.
- Gunawardane, K.; Kularatna, Nihal (2018). "Supercapacitor Assisted Low Dropout Regulator Technique: A New Design Approach to Achieve High-Efficiency Linear DC-DC Converters". IET Power Electronics. 11 (2): 229–238. doi:10.1049/iet-pel.2017.0093.
- James, S.; Kularatna, Nihal; Steyn-Ross, A.; Kunnemeyer, R. (2015). "Estimation of Transient Surge Energy Transferred with Associated Time Delays for Individual Components of Surge Protector Circuits". IET Power Electronics. 8 (5): 685–692. doi:10.1049/iet-pel.2014.0212.
- Kankanamge, K.; Kularatna, Nihal (2014). "Improving the End-to-End Efficiency of DC-DC Converters Based on a Supercapacitor Assisted Low Dropout Regulators (SCALDO) Technique". IEEE Transactions on Industrial Electronics. 61 (1): 223–230. doi:10.1109/TIE.2013.2245613.
- Kularatna, Nihal (2014). "Dynamics and Modelling of Rechargeable Batteries: What Electrochemists Work Tells the Electronic Engineers". IEEE Power Electronics Magazine. 1 (4): 23–33. Bibcode:2014IPEM....1d..23K. doi:10.1109/MPEL.2014.2361264.
- Kankanamge, K.; Kularatna, Nihal; Steyn-Ross, David A. (2012). "Laplace Transform-Based Theoretical Foundations and Experimental Validations: Low-Frequency Supercapacitor Circulation for Efficiency Improvements in Linear Regulators". IET Power Electronics. 5 (9): 1785–1792. doi:10.1049/iet-pel.2011.0296. hdl:10292/8378.
- Kularatna, Nihal; Fernando, J.; Pandey, A.; James, S. (2011). "Surge Capability Testing of Supercapacitor Families Using a Lightning Surge Simulator". IEEE Transactions on Industrial Electronics. 58 (10): 4942–4949. Bibcode:2011ITIE...58.4942K. doi:10.1109/TIE.2011.2109338.
- Kularatna, Nihal (2003). "Understanding A to D Architectures". Electronics Systems and Software (Sept/Oct): 20–23. doi:10.1049/ess:20030404 (inactive 6 June 2026).
- Kularatna, A.D.V.N. (1988). "Low Cost Fast AC Regulator Provides High Waveform Fidelity". Power Conversion and Intelligent Motion (May): 76–78.
- Kularatna, A.D.V.N. (1981). "Optosensor Limits Shunt Supply's No Load Current". Electronics (13 January): 174.
- Kularatna, A.D.V.N. (1980). "Foldback Limiter Protects High Current Regulators". Electronics (January): 98.
- Kularatna, A.D.V.N. (1978). "A Variable Shunt Regulated Power Supply". Electronic Engineering (June): 21.
