= Etag =

Etag can refer to:

- HTTP ETag, entity tag, part of the HTTP protocol for the World Wide Web
- etags, the ctags utility that comes with Emacs
- NERC Tag, also known as E-Tag, a transaction on the North American bulk electricity market
- e-TAG, an electronic tolling system used on tollways in Australia
- European Technology Assessment Group, a network of scientific institutions
- European Technical Approval Guidelines, drafted by the European Organisation for Technical Approvals
