= TA-SWISS =

The Foundation for Technology Assessment TA-SWISS is a Centre of Competence of the Swiss Academies of Arts and Sciences, based on a mandate in the Swiss federal law on research. It is an advisory body, financed by public money, and devoted to technology assessment. (The abbreviation «TA» which is used to describe TA-SWISS stands for Technology Assessment, and reflects the activities of the Centre.)

== Mission ==
The object of the Foundation for Technology Assessment TA-SWISS is to follow technological changes and developments and to identify the social, legal and ethical consequences of new technologies. Another element of its mission is to encourage the discussion of scientific and technological challenges.

The recommendations that result from TA-SWISS projects are used to assist the decision making process, and are intended for the Swiss Parliament and the Federal Council. Depending on the topics covered, these recommendations may also be of interest to other groups, such as professional associations, commercial enterprises, universities and stakeholder groups, as well as public administrations. The media, in their role as disseminators of information, are also kept regularly informed about the activities of TA-SWISS.

== Organisation ==
The Foundation Council is responsible for the strategic orientation and overall management of the TA-Swiss Foundation. It works closely with the Steering Committee, which is responsible for content-related issues. The Steering Committee consists of 10 to 15 members from various sectors of society. In addition, guests representing institutions also sit on the Steering Committee.

== Activities ==
The activities of the Foundation for Technology Assessment can be divided into two methodological areas. On the one hand, the Foundation commissions interdisciplinary scientific studies, and on the other hand, TA-SWISS carries out participatory projects with the involvement and participation of citizens. TA-SWISS focuses on the following topics: biotechnology/medicine, the information society, and mobility/energy/climate.

== History ==
Experimental beginnings: TA-SWISS began its work in 1992. Following a number of parliamentary interventions, the Federal Council assigned the Swiss Science and Technology Council the task of developing a system of technology assessment for Switzerland over a four-year pilot phase (1992–1995).

Institutionalisation of technology assessment: In its Message relating to the promotion of training, research and technology for the years 1996-1999, the Federal Council defined the bases for the institutionalisation and financing of technology assessment in Switzerland. In 1999, technology assessment was firmly fixed in the law on research. In this way, the Federal Council reinforced the independence of TA-SWISS, which until 2007 was affiliated to the Swiss Science and Technology Council.

In 2008 a change in the law on research conferred the legal basis on the incorporation of the mandate for TA-SWISS within the Association of Swiss Academies of Arts and Sciences. Accordingly, since 1 January 2008 TA-SWISS has been a Centre for Excellence of the Swiss Academies of Arts and Sciences.

TA-Swiss is full member of the European Parliamentary Technology Assessment (EPTA) network and is a founding member of the German speaking Network NTA (Netzwerk Technikfolgenabschätzung).

== See also ==
- Citizen science
- Participatory monitoring
- Participatory action research
