= Stewart Russell =

Stewart Russell (6 August 1955 – 17 September 2011) was a senior lecturer and interdisciplinary researcher in Science, Technology and Innovation Studies at the University of Edinburgh. Innovative in his approach, Stewart believed that to achieve sustainable change it was necessary to address the interplay between science and technology and social and institutional factors. He worked with a diverse communities including trade unions, government and public institutions.

After graduating in physical science from Pembroke College, Cambridge, UK, Stewart made a sharp turn towards social science and took a PhD in the Technology Policy Unit of Aston University, UK. He dedicated the rest of his career to exploring the challenges of environmental sustainability across a range of technological fields.

In 1988 he accepted a position as lecturer in Science, Technology and Society at the University of Wollongong, in New South Wales, Australia. He returned to the United Kingdom in 2006 to join the University of Edinburgh as deputy director of the Research Centre for Social Sciences. In this role he helped build the interdisciplinary research programmes of the Institute for the Study of Science, Technology and Innovation, and bring together the Research Centre for Social Studies and Science Studies Unit as the Science, Technology and Innovation Studies subject group. Collaborating with the National Museum of Scotland Stewart developed the innovative "Understanding Technology" public lecture series. These lectures are continued and held to commemorate his contribution.

On 30 March 2012 a symposium was held to celebrate his contribution to the academic field. In 2013, the Stewart Russell Memorial Fund to support students at the University of Edinburgh was established to commemorate his commitment and passion in helping students achieve their full potential.
