= Institute for Technology Assessment and Systems Analysis =

Research institute of Karlsruhe Institute of Technology

The Institute for Technology Assessment and Systems Analysis (ITAS) is a research facility of the Karlsruhe Institute of Technology (KIT) in Karlsruhe, Germany. It was founded on 1 July 1995 as successor of different institutions. ITAS came into being after a merger of the University of Karlsruhe (TH) and Research Center Karlsruhe on 1 October 2009. The institute is also a member of the Helmholtz Association of German Research Centres (HGF).

ITAS is the largest and longest standing scientific institution in Germany dealing with technology assessment (TA) and systems analysis in theory and practice. Today, more than 110 researchers work at ITAS. Since 1990 it operates the Office of Technology Assessment at the German Bundestag (TAB). Since 1992 it is publishing a journal on technology assessment (Technikfolgenabschätzung – Theorie und Praxis). Since October 1999 it is headed by Armin Grunwald.

== Aims and objectives ==
The Institute for Technology Assessment and Systems Analysis (ITAS) investigates scientific and technological developments with a focus on their impacts and possible systemic and unintended effects. It produces analytical knowledge and assessments of socio-technical developments in order to provide policy and design options for decision-makers. The research covers ethical, ecological, economic, social, political-institutional, and cultural questions. Major goals are advice for research and technology policy, provision of knowledge for the design of socio-technical systems, and the organization and observation of discursive processes on open and controversial questions of technology policy.

== Co-operation ==
ITAS is a member of several international networks. It is one of the initiators of "Netzwerk TA" (NTA), a network of German, Austrian and Swiss TA institutions. It is also member of the European Parliamentary Technology Assessment (EPTA) Network and of the UNEP-SETAC Life Cycle Initiative. In addition, the institute is committed in the Society for the Study of Nanoscience and Emerging Technologies (S.NET) since its foundation, and maintains institutional relationships with the New University of Lisbon, the Lomonossow University in Moscow as well as with the University of the Basque Country (UPV/EHU).

== History ==
The history of ITAS and its preceding institutions dates back to the 1950s. In 1958 the Study Group for Systems Research (SfS) was founded in Heidelberg by Helmut Krauch. In 1975, a part of the SfS was integrated in the Institute for Applied Systems Engineering and Nuclear Physics (IASR) of Nuclear Research Center Karlsruhe led by Wolf Häfele. In 1977 the division of Applied Systems Analysis (AFAS) is established as an independently operating off-spring of the IASR, which is headed by Herbert Paschen. On 1 July 1995 this unit was upgraded becoming the Institute for Technology Assessment and Systems Analysis (ITAS).
