= Swiss Academies of Arts and Sciences =

Swiss organization

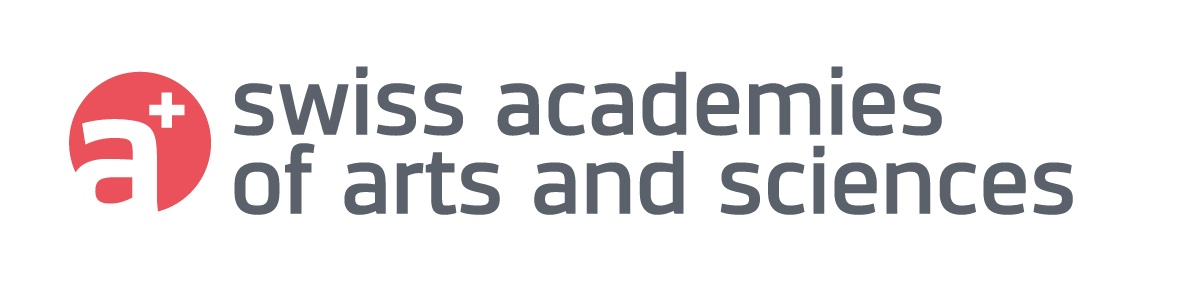
Logo

The Swiss Academies of Arts and Sciences (French: Académies suisses des sciences, Italian: Accademie svizzere delle scienze, Romansh: Academias svizras da las scienzas, German: Akademien der Wissenschaften Schweiz) are an association comprising the four academies of arts and sciences in Switzerland. On behalf of the federal government they promote cooperation within and between academic disciplines and are committed to fostering dialogue between science, politics and society.

== Legal basis, remit and funding ==
The objectives and tasks that the academies carry out on behalf of the Federal Council are set out in Articles 4 and 11 of the Federal Act on the Promotion of Research and Innovation (FIFG).

The network is intended to help link the sciences at regional, national and international levels and to represent the knowledge community independently of institutions and disciplines. Its tasks also include the promotion of academic excellence, scientific integrity and research ethics.^{,}

The Association of Academies fosters and promotes dialogue between the scientific community, politics and society. It is also involved in early detection and assessment of the consequences of technology. The academies and their members award various prizes^{,} to promote science and support the next generation of scientists.

In accordance with their statutory mandate, the Swiss Academies of Arts and Sciences receive their funding from the federal government, supplemented by other targeted financing, such as external funding.

== Organisation ==
With over 100,000 members, the Association of Academies is Switzerland’s largest scientific network. It operates on a voluntary basis and comprises more than 160 professional associations, over 100 commissions, working groups and advisory boards, as well as just under 30 cantonal and regional association. These are organised within the Swiss Academies of Arts and Sciences, which comprises four academies and two centres of excellence:

=== Academies ===
- Swiss Academy of Sciences (SCNAT)
- Swiss Academy of Medical Sciences (SAMW)
- Swiss Academy of Humanities and Social Sciences (SAGW)
- Swiss Academy of Engineering Sciences (SATW)

=== Centres of excellence ===
- Science et Cité Foundation
- Foundation for Technology Assessment (TA-SWISS)

== Tasks and activity ==
=== Strengthening academia ===
The academies promote collaboration within and between academic disciplines. They support open-access publications and fund research infrastructures and so-called long-term projects (Année Politique Suisse, Dodis, Historical Dictionary of Switzerland, National Dictionaries of Switzerland, infoclio.ch). They also coordinate national initiatives such as the Swiss Personalised Health Network (sponsored by: SAMW) and the Swiss Quantum Initiative (sponsored by: SCNAT).

=== Dialogue between science and society ===
The academies promote science communication and participatory approaches such as citizen science and transdisciplinary research. They help to develop skills such as data literacy and coordinate initiatives in the field of STEM education.

=== Political dialogue at national level ===
The Swiss Academies of Arts and Sciences maintain dialogue with representatives from the political sphere at national level, in particular through events of varying sizes.

They are also responsible for coordinating the national network for scientific advice. This network brings together Switzerland’s leading scientific organisations, the Federal Chancellery and the Federal Administration. It is intended to facilitate mobilisation of scientific expertise in the field of crisis prevention and management. In the field of science policy, the academies regularly comment on issues relating to science, research and innovation.

=== Swiss Young Academy ===
The Swiss Young Academy is a platform run by the Swiss Academies of Arts and Sciences to support the next generation of scientists. It brings together early-career scientists from various disciplines and universities and promotes inter- and transdisciplinary dialogue within these institutions, as well as engagement with issues at the intersections of science, politics and society.

== Publications ==
=== Swiss Academies Series ===
The Swiss Academies of Arts and Sciences publish the Swiss Academies Series.

The Swiss Academies Series synthesises socially relevant current research findings and presents them in a manner accessible to a wide audience. The Swiss Academies Series comprises three elements:

- Swiss Academies Reports: Comprehensive studies, review articles, background reports and conference proceedings
- Swiss Academies Communications: Policy papers, discussion papers, position papers, statements, recommendations and workshop summaries
- Swiss Academies Fact Sheets: Easily understandable summaries of current topics presented in an engaging way

== Partner organisations ==
The Swiss Academies of Arts and Sciences work closely with other institutions in Switzerland’s education, research and innovation sector.

=== International partner organisations ===
- All European Academies (ALLEA)
- European Academies' Science Advisory Council (EASAC)
- InterAcademy Partnership (IAP)

== See also ==
- Research magazine Horizons
- Life Sciences Switzerland
- Science and technology in Switzerland
- Swiss National Science Foundation
