= Institute of Technology Assessment =

Research unit of the Austrian Academy of Sciences

The Institute of Technology Assessment (ITA; German: Institut für Technikfolgen-Abschätzung) is a research unit of the Austrian Academy of Sciences in Vienna.

ITA-Logo, English

The ITA is the only institution in Austria that is entirely devoted to technology assessment (TA). Together with its partner Austrian Institute of Technology, it advises the Austrian Parliament. The institute organises for many years the internationally renowned annual TA conferences in Vienna. Moreover, it serves as a national and international networking node of the TA community. ITA is a full member of the European Parliamentary Technology Assessment (EPTA) network, is a founding member of the German-speaking Network NTA (Netzwerk Technikfolgenabschätzung) and of the globalTA network and is, since 2008, a member of the European Technology Assessment Group (ETAG).

== History ==
Founded in 1985 as a working group within the former "Institute for Socio-economic Development Research and Technology Assessment" (Institut für Sozio-ökonomische Entwicklungsforschung und Technikbewertung, ISET), since the end of 1987 independent as "Technology Assessment Unit (TAU)" ("Forschungsstelle für Technikbewertung ", FTB)); since 1994 an institute (ITA) of the Austrian Academy of Sciences. Its founding director was the physicist prof. Ernest Braun (previously director of the Technology Policy Unit at Aston University in Great Britain). The second director was the economist prof. Gunther Tichy (full professor at the University of Graz and senior researcher at the Austrian Institute of Economic Research in Vienna. Since 2006 Michael Nentwich, law and STS (science and technology studies) scholar, directs the institute. Currently, the institute has approx. Twenty-five staff members, among them twenty researchers from the natural and engineering sciences, humanities and social sciences.

== Main areas of research ==
The ITA focuses on the following themes:

- The information society, in particular "E-governance: ICT in the realm of the state", "Privacy and security technologies" and "Networked environments" (with a focus on the Internet)
- Governance of controversial technologies
- Technology and sustainability
- Cross-cutting issues of technology assessment and methods

ITA recently added a "topics" section describing the main topics it deals with in plain language.

== Publications ==
Some of ITA's publications are published in special series on the publication server of the Austrian Academy of Sciences with the institute serving as a publisher:

- "ITA Dossiers": two pages to present research results in non-scientific language with a view to give options for action to politics and society
- ITA Manu:scripts: academic working-papers
- ITA Reports: results of research projects
- "NanoTrust Dossiers": short reports, 3-6 pages, with results of the project NanoTrust, that is on health and environmental aspects and societal issues regarding nanotechnologies
