= Robin Williams (academic) =

British social scientist (born 1952)

Robin Alun Williams
- Born: 13 November 1952 (age 73); London, England
- Education: Cambridge University
- Spouse: Dr. Xiaobai Shen
- Children: Ben and Leon Williams
- Scientific career
- Workplaces: University of Edinburgh

Robin Williams (born 13 November 1952) is a British social scientist who is professor of social research on technology at the University of Edinburgh, Scotland, and director of the Institute for the Study of Science, Technology and Innovation. He is an interdisciplinary researcher in the field of Science and Technology Studies and contributed much to the social shaping of technology by studying the interplay between 'social' and 'technical' factors in the design and implementation of a range of technologies.

== Biography ==
After studying Natural Sciences and Social and Political Science at Clare College, Cambridge, Robin Williams took an MSc and PhD at Aston University and worked as research fellow in the Technology Policy Unit until 1986. He then joined the Research Centre for Social Sciences (RCSS) at the University of Edinburgh and coordinated the Edinburgh PICT Centre, one of the six university research centres established under the ESRC Programme on Information and Communications Technologies (1986 - 1995). During this time Robin Williams and other researchers in Edinburgh PICT Centre published on issues regarding social, economic and political aspects of the design and implementation of technology. Concluding the findings of a decade's research Robin Williams and David Edge published a notable paper on the ‘broad church’ of social shaping of technology. He became director of RCSS in 1997.

In 2000 Robin Williams established the Institute for the Study of Science, Technology and Innovation (ISSTI) to bring together groups of academics and individual researchers across the University of Edinburgh who are involved in research, teaching and knowledge transfer on social and policy aspects of science, technology and innovation. He was co-director of ESRC Innogen Centre from 2002-2012. In 2008 he arranged the merger of RCSS and the Science Studies Unit to form the Science, Technology and Innovation Studies subject group in the University of Edinburgh School of Social and Political Science. Professor Williams established institutional links to and between research centres and institutions throughout the UK, Europe and Asia. His various involvements included co-chairing the UK Association for Studies in Innovation Science and Technology (AsSIST), being representative of Britain on the COST A4 European Research Collaboration initiative on the Social Shaping of Technology and coordinator of the China-EU Information Technology Standards Research Project (2008-2010).

== Books ==
- Neil Pollock and Robin Williams. After Hype: The Business of Taming the Digital Economy (2026). Cambridge University Press.
- Neil Pollock and Robin Williams. How Industry Analysts Shape the Digital Future (2016). Oxford University Press.
- Neil Pollock and Robin Williams. Software and Organisations: The Biography of the Enterprise-Wide System - Or how SAP Conquered the World (2009). Oxfordshire, UK: Routledge.
- Robin Williams, James Stewart, and Roger Slack. Social Learning in Technological Innovation: Experimenting with Information and Communication Technologies (2005). Cheltenham, UK: Edward Elgar.
- Robin Williams and Knut H. Sørensen, eds. Shaping Technology, Guiding Policy: Concepts, Spaces and Tools (2002). Cheltenham, UK: Edward Elgar.
- Robin Williams, Antony Clayton, and Graham Spinardi. Policies for Cleaner Technology: A New Agenda for Government and Industry (1999). Earthscan.
- Robin Williams, Wendy Faulkner, and Jamie Fleck, eds. Exploring Expertise (1998). New York: Macmillan.
- Robin Williams, Herbert Kubicek, and William Dutton. The Social Shaping of Information Superhighways: European and American Roads to the Information Society (1997). Campus Verlag.
- Robin Williams, Robin Fincham, James Fleck, Rob Proctor, Harry Scarbrough, and Margaret Tierney. Expertise and Innovation: Information Technology Strategies in the Financial Services Sector (1994). Oxford University Press.
