= International Relations and Global Climate Change =

2001 book edited by Urs Luterbacher and Detlef F. Sprinz

International Relations and Global Climate Change is a 2001 book edited by Urs Luterbacher and Detlef F. Sprinz. It was published by MIT Press. The book includes a critical review of international relations literature in relation to climate issues. It includes conceptual, theoretical, and methodological analyses of global climate change politics. The book is an interdisciplinary overview.
