= Technology assessment =

Determining the value of a new technology

Technology assessment (TA, German: Technikfolgenabschätzung, French: Évaluation des choix scientifiques et technologiques) is a practical process of determining the value of a new or emerging technology in and of itself or against existing technologies. This is a means of assessing and rating the new technology from the time when it was first developed to the time when it is potentially accepted by the public and authorities for further use. In essence, TA could be defined as "a form of policy research that examines short- and long term consequences (for example, societal, economic, ethical, legal) of the application of technology."

== General description ==
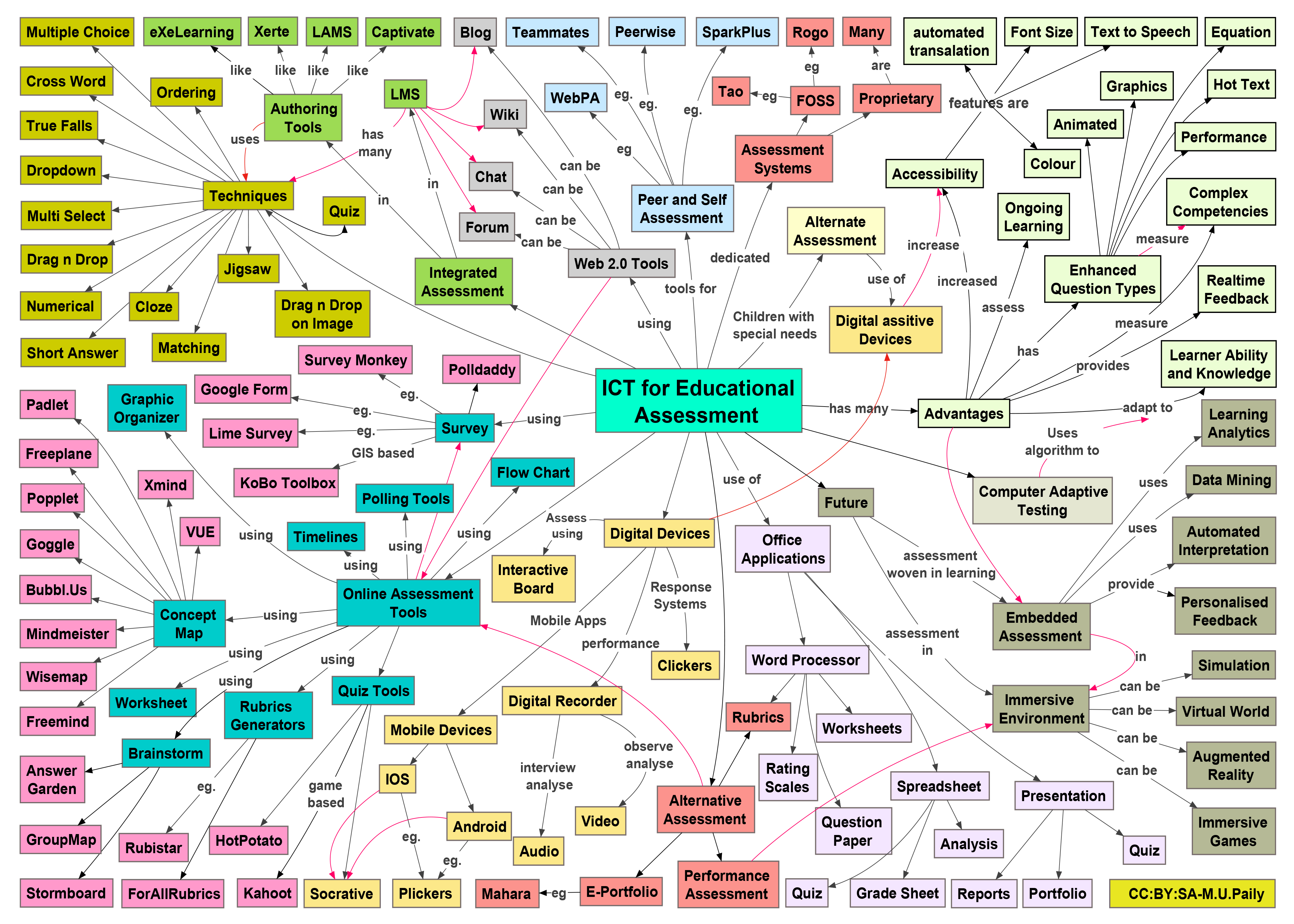
Example of assessment of ICT for educational assessment

TA is the study and evaluation of new technologies. It is a way of trying to forecast and prepare for the upcoming technological advancements and their repercussions to the society, and then make decisions based on the judgments. It is based on the conviction that new developments within, and discoveries by, the scientific community are relevant for the world at large rather than just for the scientific experts themselves, and that technological progress can never be free of ethical implications. Technology assessment was initially practiced in the 1960s in the United States where it would focus on analyzing the significance of "supersonic transportation, pollution of the environment and ethics of genetic screening."

Also, technology assessment recognizes the fact that scientists normally are not trained ethicists themselves and accordingly ought to be very careful when passing ethical judgement on their own, or their colleagues, new findings, projects, or work in progress. TA is a very broad phenomenon which also includes aspects such as "diffusion of technology (and technology transfer), factors leading to rapid acceptance of new technology, and the role of technology and society."

Technology assessment assumes a global perspective and is future-oriented, not anti-technological. TA considers its task as an interdisciplinary approach to solving already existing problems and preventing potential damage caused by the uncritical application and the commercialization of new technologies.

Therefore, any results of technology assessment studies must be published, and particular consideration must be given to communication with political decision-makers.

An important problem concerning technology assessment is the so-called Collingridge dilemma: on the one hand, impacts of new technologies cannot be easily predicted until the technology is extensively developed and widely used; on the other hand, control or change of a technology is difficult as soon as it is widely used. It emphasizes on the fact that technologies, in their early stage, are unpredictable with regard to their implications and rather tough to regulate or control once it has been widely accepted by the society. Shaping or directing this technology is the desired direction becomes difficult for the authorities at this period of time. There have been several approaches put in place in order to tackle this dilemma, one of the common ones being "anticipation." In this approach, authorities and assessors "anticipate ethical impacts of a technology ("technomoral scenarios"), being too speculative to be reliable, or on ethically regulating technological developments ("sociotechnical experiments"), discarding anticipation of the future implications."

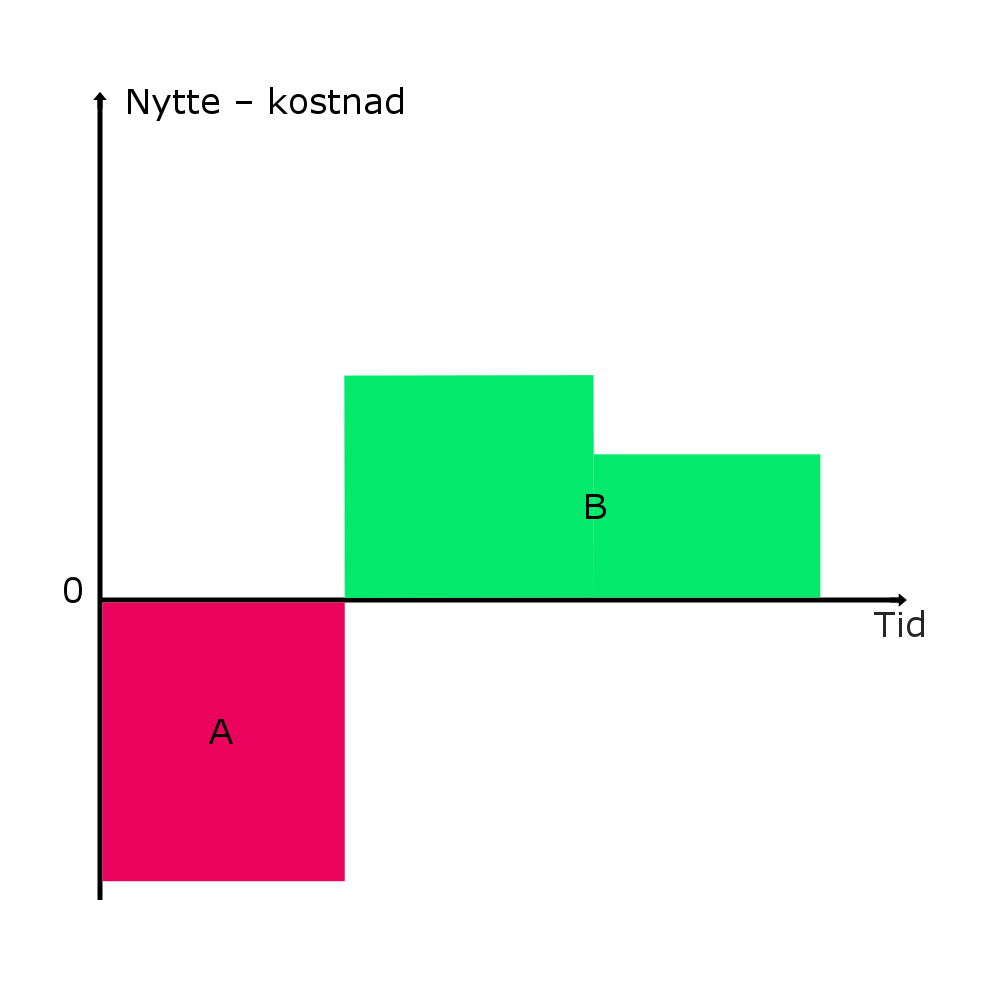
Comparing costs and benefit of each decision

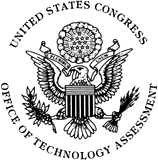
Seal of the United States Office of Technology Assessment

Technology assessments, which are a form of cost–benefit analysis, are a medium for decision makers to evaluate and analyze solutions with regard to the particular technology assessment, and choose a best possible option which is cost effective and obeys the authoritative and budgetary requirements. However, they are difficult if not impossible to carry out in an objective manner since subjective decisions and value judgments have to be made regarding a number of complex issues such as (a) the boundaries of the analysis (i.e., what costs are internalized and externalized), (b) the selection of appropriate indicators of potential positive and negative consequences of the new technology, (c) the monetization of non-market values, and (d) a wide range of ethical perspectives. Consequently, most technology assessments are neither objective nor value-neutral exercises but instead are greatly influenced and biased by the values of the most powerful stakeholders, which are in many cases the developers and proponents (i.e., corporations and governments) of new technologies under consideration. In the most extreme view, as expressed by Ian Barbour in '’Technology, Environment, and Human Values'’, technology assessment is "a one-sided apology for contemporary technology by people with a stake in its continuation."

Overall, technology assessment is a very broad field which reaches beyond just technology and industrial phenomenons. It handles the assessment of effects, consequences, and risks of a technology, but also is a forecasting function looking into the projection of opportunities and skill development as an input into strategic planning." Some of the major fields of TA are: information technology, hydrogen technologies, nuclear technology, molecular nanotechnology, pharmacology, organ transplants, gene technology, artificial intelligence, the Internet and many more.

=== Forms and concepts of technology assessment ===
The following types of concepts of TA are those that are most visible and practiced. There are, however, a number of further TA forms that are only proposed as concepts in the literature or are the label used by a particular TA institution.

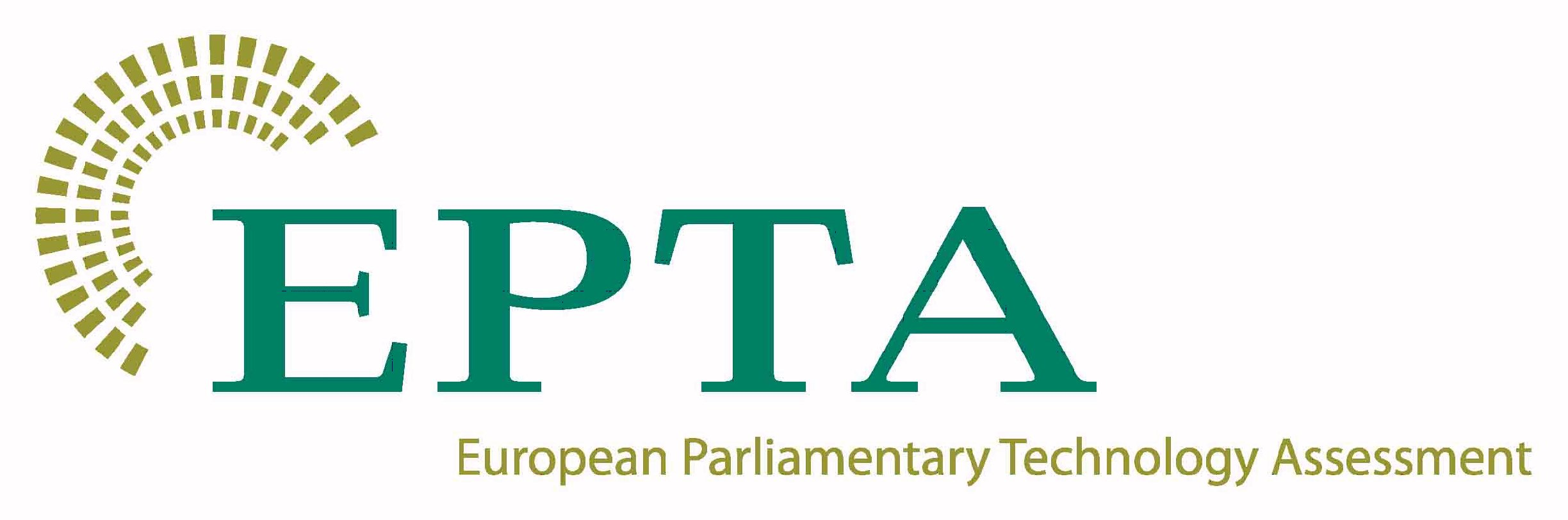
Logo of the European Parliamentary Technology Assessment

- Parliamentary TA (PTA): TA activities of various kinds whose addressee is a parliament. PTA may be performed directly by members of those parliaments (e.g. in France and Finland) or on their behalf of related TA institutions (such as in the UK, in Germany and Denmark) or by organisations not directly linked to a Parliament (such as in the Netherlands and Switzerland).
- Expert TA (often also referred to as the classical TA or traditional TA concept): TA activities carried out by (a team of) TA and technical experts. Input from stakeholders and other actors is included only via written statements, documents and interviews, but not as in participatory TA.
- Participatory TA (pTA): TA activities which actively, systematically and methodologically involve various kinds of social actors as assessors and discussants, such as different kinds of civil society organisations, representatives of the state systems, but characteristically also individual stakeholders and citizens (lay persons), technical scientists and technical experts. Standard pTA methods include consensus conferences, focus groups, scenario workshops etc. Sometimes pTA is further divided into expert-stakeholder pTA and public pTA (including lay persons). The participatory assessment makes room for the inclusion of laypeople and establishes the value of varied point of views, interests and knowledge. It shows importance of the need for decision makers and actors to have a varied set of mindsets and perspective to make a combined, informed and rational decision.
- Constructive TA (CTA): This concept of TA, developed in the Netherlands, but also applied and discussed elsewhere attempts to broaden the design of new technology through feedback of TA activities into the actual construction of technology. Contrary to other forms of TA, CTA is not directed toward influencing regulatory practices by assessing the impacts of technology. Instead, CTA wants to address social issues around technology by influencing design practices. It aims to "mobilize insights on co-evolutionary dynamics of science, technology and society for anticipating and assessing technologies, rather than being predominantly concerned with assessing societal impacts of a quasi-given technology." This assessment established the value of involving users in the development and innovation process, encouraging the development and adaptation of new technology in their daily life.
- Discursive TA or Argumentative TA: This type of TA wants to deepen the political and normative debate about science, technology and society. It is inspired by ethics, policy discourse analysis and the sociology of expectations in science and technology. This mode of TA aims to clarify and bring under public and political scrutiny the normative assumptions and visions that drive the actors who are socially shaping science and technology. This assessment can be used as a tool to analyse and evaluate the background of each and every reaction or perception that takes place for each technology; often some of the reactions these assessors receive are not related to science or technology. Some of the ways of analyzing actors and their reaction is by "studying prospective users' everyday-life practices in their own right, and in naturalistic settings." Accordingly, argumentative TA not only addresses the side effects of technological change, but deals with both broader impacts of science and technology and the fundamental normative question of why developing a certain technology is legitimate and desirable.

== Technology assessment institutions around the world ==
Many TA institutions are members of the European Parliamentary Technology Assessment (EPTA) network, some are working for the STOA panel of the European Parliament and formed the European Technology Assessment Group (ETAG).

- Centre for Technology Assessment (TA-SWISS), Bern, Switzerland.
- Department of Science, Technology and Policy Studies, University of Twente
- Institute of Technology Assessment (ITA) of the Austrian Academy of Sciences, Vienna
- Institute for Technology Assessment and Systems Analysis, Karlsruhe Institute of Technology, Germany
- (former) Office of Technology Assessment (OTA)
- The Danish Board of Technology Foundation, Copenhagen
- Norwegian Board of Technology, Oslo
- Oficina de Ciencia y Tecnología del Congreso (OficinaC), Spain
- Parliamentary Office for the Evaluation of Scientific and Technological Choices (OPECST), Paris
- Parliamentary Office of Science and Technology (POST), London
- Rathenau Institute, The Hague
- Science and Technology Options Assessment (STOA) panel of the European Parliament, Brussels
- Science and Technology Policy Research (SPRU), Sussex
- Technology centre CAS (TC CAS), Prague, Czech Republic

== See also ==
- History of science and technology
- Horizon scanning
- Scientific lacuna
- Technology
  - Technology dynamics
  - Technology forecasting
  - Technology readiness level
  - Technology transfer
