= Technology dynamics =

Scientific field

Technology dynamics is broad and relatively new scientific field that has been developed in the framework of the postwar science and technology studies field. It studies the process of technological change. Under the field of Technology Dynamics the process of technological change is explained by taking into account influences from "internal factors" as well as from "external factors". Internal factors relate technological change to unsolved technical problems and the established modes of solving technological problems and external factors relate it to various (changing) characteristics of the social environment, in which a particular technology is embedded.

== Overview ==
For the last three decades, it has been argued that technology development is neither an autonomous process, determined by the "inherent progress" of human history, nor a process completely determined by external conditions like the prices of the resources that are needed to operate (develop) a technology, as it is theorized in neoclassical economic thinking. In mainstream neoclassical economic thinking, technology is seen as an exogenous factor: at the moment a technology is required, the most appropriate version can be taken down from the shelf based on costs of labor, capital and eventually raw materials.

Conversely, modern technology dynamics studies generally advocate that technologies are not "self-evident" or market-demanded, but are the upshot of a particular path of technology development and are shaped by social, economic and political factors. in this sense, technology dynamics aims at overcoming distinct "internal" and "external" points of views by presenting co-evolutionary approach regarding technology development.

In general, technology dynamics studies, besides giving a "thick description" of technology development, uses constructivist viewpoints emphasizing that technology is the outcome of particular social context. Accordingly, Technology Dynamics emphasizes the significance and possibility of regaining social control of technology, and also provides mechanisms needed to adapt to and steer the development of certain technologies. In that respect, it uses insights from retrospective studies to formulate hypotheses of a prospective nature on technology development of emerging technologies, besides formulating prescriptive policy recommendations.

An important feature of relevant theories of technological change therein is that they underline the quasi-evolutionary character of technological change: change based on technological variation and social selection in which technological knowledge, systems and institutions develop in interaction with each other. Processes of 'path dependence' are crucial in explaining technological change.

Following these lines, there have been different approaches and concepts used under the field of technology dynamics.

== Different frameworks to analyze the dynamics of technology ==
- Social construction of technology
- Actor–network theory
- Systems theory
- Normalization process theory
- Quasi-evolutionary theories
- Innovation system
- Technological innovation system

Based on the analysis of the various perspectives, one can aim at developing interventions in the dynamics of a technology. Some approaches have been developed targeting on interventions in technological change:

- Technology assessment
- Backcasting
- Strategic niche management
- Transition management (governance)
