= Office of Technology Assessment =

United States Congress office (1974–1995)

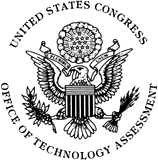
OTA seal

The Office of Technology Assessment (OTA) was an office of the United States Congress that operated from 1974 to 1995. OTA's purpose was to provide congressional members and committees with objective and authoritative analysis of the complex scientific and technical issues of the late 20th century, i.e. technology assessment. It was a leader in practicing and encouraging delivery of public services in innovative and inexpensive ways, including early involvement in the distribution of government documents through electronic publishing. Its model was widely copied around the world.

The OTA was authorized in 1972 and received its first funding in fiscal year 1974. It was defunded at the end of 1995, following the 1994 mid-term elections which led to Republican control of the Senate and the House. House Republican legislators characterized the OTA as wasteful and hostile to GOP interests.

Princeton University hosts The OTA Legacy site, which holds "the complete collection of OTA publications along with additional materials that illuminate the history and impact of the agency." On July 23, 2008 the Federation of American Scientists launched a similar archive that includes interviews and additional documents about OTA.

== History ==
Congress established the Office of Technology Assessment with the Technology Assessment Act of 1972. It was governed by a twelve-member board, comprising six members of Congress from each party—half from the Senate and half from the House of Representatives. During its twenty-four-year life it produced about 750 studies on a wide range of topics, including acid rain, health care, global climate change, and polygraphs.

=== Closure ===
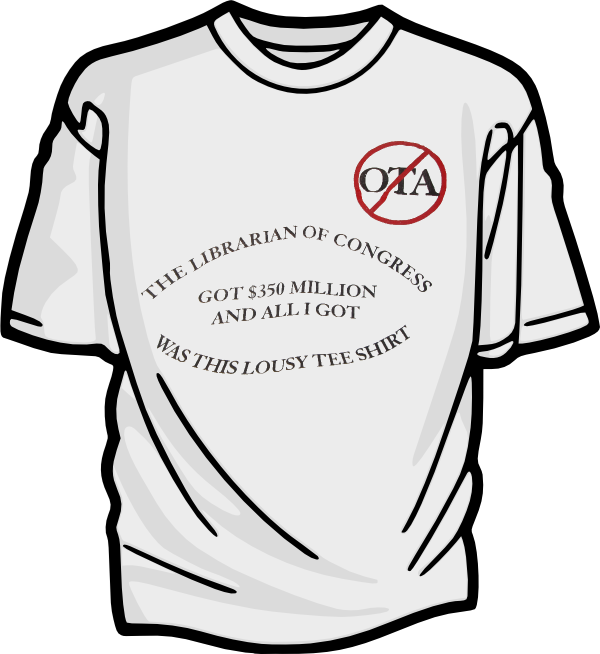
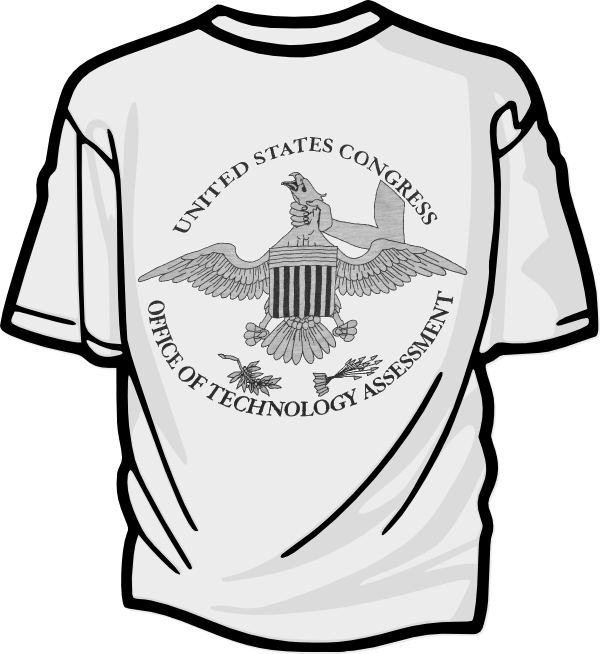
The front and back of a tee shirt created and worn by some staff of the OTA to express their sentiments about the intent of the 104th Congress to terminate their service while simultaneously increasing the Library of Congress' budget by an amount equal to nearly twice that of OTA's. Compare to the official seal above, and note the arm of Congress strangling the symbolic U.S.A. in the satirical version.

Criticism of the agency was fueled by Fat City, a 1980 book by Washington Times journalist Donald Lambro that was regarded favorably by the Reagan administration; it called OTA an "unnecessary agency" that duplicated government work done elsewhere. OTA was abolished (technically "de-funded") in the "Contract with America" period of Newt Gingrich's Republican ascendancy in Congress. According to Science magazine, "some Republican lawmakers came to view [the OTA] as duplicative, wasteful, and biased against their party."

When the 104th Congress withdrew funding for OTA, it had a statutory limit of 143 full-time staff (augmented by various project-based contractors) and an annual budget of $21.9 million."Legislative Branch Appropriations Act, FY1995". U.S. Congress. July 24, 1994. The closure of OTA was criticized at the time, including by Republican representative Amo Houghton, who commented at the time of OTA's defunding that "we are cutting off one of the most important arms of Congress when we cut off unbiased knowledge about science and technology."

Critics of the closure saw it as an example of politics overriding science, and a variety of scientists have called for the agency's reinstatement. Law professor and legal scholar David L. Faigman also made a strong case supporting the role OTA had played, also calling for its reinstatement.

=== Subsequent developments ===
While the OTA was closed down, the idea of technology assessment survived, in particular in Europe. The European Parliamentary Technology Assessment (EPTA) network coordinates members of technology assessment units working for various European governments. The US Government Accountability Office has meanwhile established a TA unit, taking on former duties of the OTA.

While campaigning in the 2008 US presidential election, Hillary Clinton pledged to work to restore the OTA if elected President. On April 29, 2009, House of Representatives member Rush Holt of New Jersey wrote an op-ed piece articulating the argument for restoring the OTA.

In April 2010 The Woodrow Wilson International Center for Scholars released a report entitled "Reinventing Technology Assessment" that emphasized citizen engagement and called for performing the functions of the OTA by creating a nationwide network of non-partisan policy research organizations, universities, and science museums: the Expert & Citizen Assessment of Science & Technology (ECAST) network. ECAST would conduct both expert and participatory technology assessments for Congress and other clients. The author of the report was Dr. Richard Sclove of the Loka Institute. The report states that the drive to modernize OTA was initiated by Darlene Cavalier, a popular citizen science advocate and author of the Science Cheerleader blog. Cavalier outlined the idea of the citizen network in a guest blog post for Discover magazine's The Intersection. She introduced the concept in an article in Science Progress in July 2008. Andrew Yang became the first 2020 presidential candidate on April 4, 2019 to push for the idea to reestablish the OTA. He did so with a detailed proposal that includes refusing to sign any budget that did not include the OTA.

In January 2019 the Government Accountability Office established the Science, Technology Assessment, and Analytics (STAA) team to take on the technology assessment mission of the former OTA. STAA developed out of a small technology assessment pilot program at GAO created in 2002, which was elevated to GAO's 15th mission team. It launched with 49 full-time equivalent staff and has since grown to over 100. In October 2019, a congressionally directed report by the National Academy of Public Administration recommended increased investment in GAO and CRS to build Congress's policy capacity in science and technology.

In 2022, Jamie Susskind advocated for bringing back the office in order to have expertise on pressing issues like artificial intelligence and online privacy. Bruce Schneier also called for a similar National Cyber Office.

== See also ==
- Administrative Conference of the United States – another federal advisory body that was defunded in 1995
