= Institute for the Study of Science, Technology and Innovation =

Coordinates: 55°56′55″N 3°11′0″W

ISSTI

Location
- Old Surgeons' Hall, High School Yards; Edinburgh; United Kingdom

Information
- Type: Public
- Established: 2001
- Founder: Robin Williams
- Director: Robin Williams
- Focus: Life Science; Innovation, Information Communication Technology; Energy Technologies & Environmental Innovation; Historical Sociology of Science, Technology and Medicine
- Functions: Research, Teaching, Knowledge Transfer
- Website: http://www.issti.ed.ac.uk/

The Institute for the Study of Science, Technology and Innovation (ISSTI) is an interdisciplinary research centre based in the UK. The research network was established in 2001 to bring together groups of academics and individual researchers across the University of Edinburgh, Edinburgh, UK. It consolidates activities in research, teaching and knowledge transfer on social and policy aspects of science, technology and innovation.

ISSTI emerged from the interdisciplinary research collaboration established amongst specialist groups and scholars at the University of Edinburgh under the ESRC Programme on Information and Communications Technology, coordinated by the Research Centre for Social Sciences. Other founding members were the Sociology subject group, the Science Studies Unit, the Japanese European Technology Studies Institute (JETS) and the Entrepreneurship and Innovation group in the Business School and Economics, and the Innogen Centre. Over time this collaboration has expanded to include a wider array of scholars and specialist centres across the University including the Schools of Informatics, Law, Public Health, and Edinburgh College of Art with links also to Geosciences, Engineering and Philosophy. Today ISSTI comprises over 100 staff and research students. It constitutes one of the most interdisciplinary groupings in the field of science, technology and innovation studies measured in terms joint publication and publication outliets.

== Research ==
The institute's research activities fall into four broad priority areas: Life Science Innovation; Information and Communication Technologies; Energy Technologies & Environmental Innovation; and, the Historical Sociology of Science, Technology and Medicine.
