= Parliamentary Office of Science and Technology =

Research and knowledge exchange service in the UK Parliament

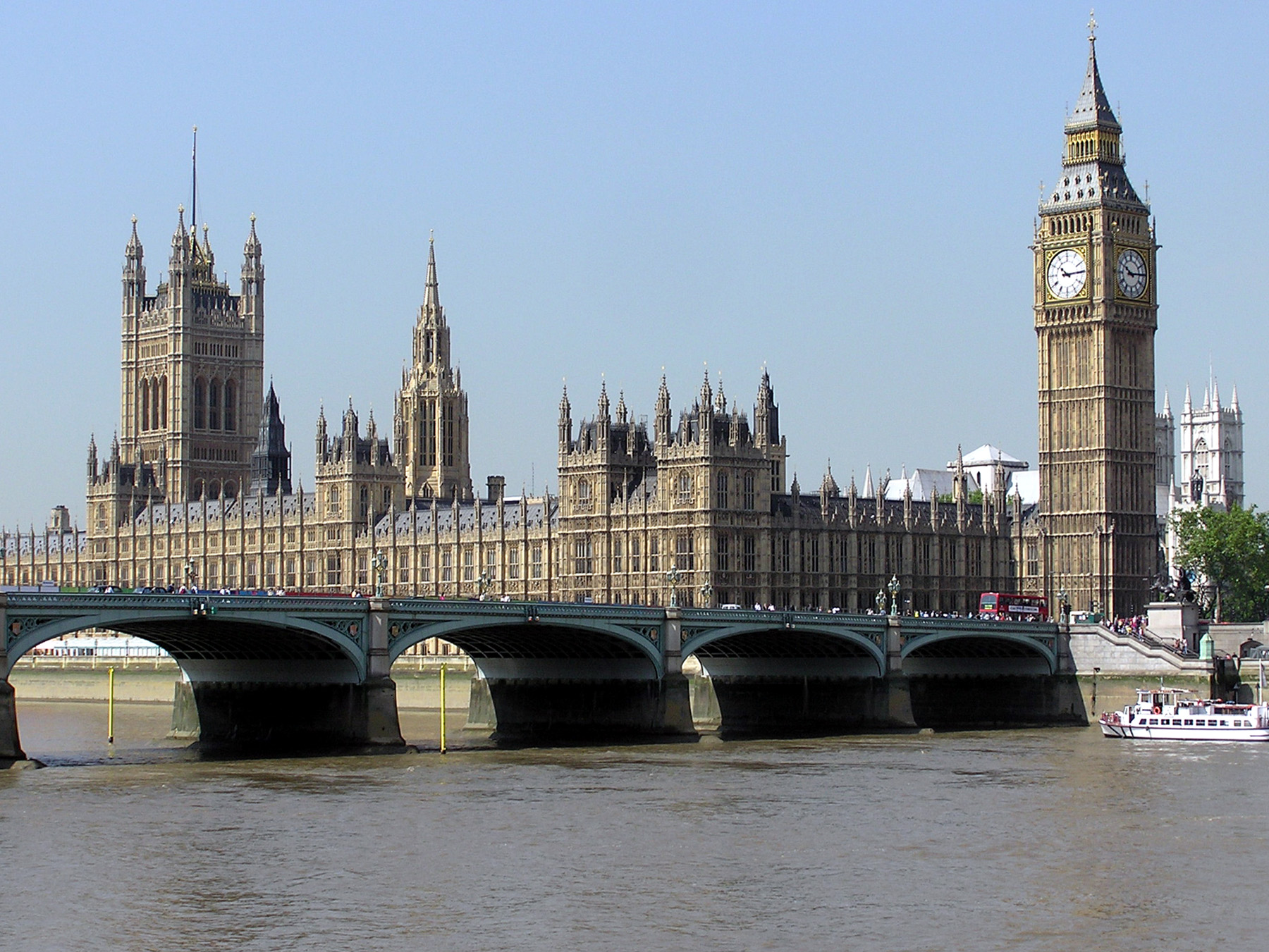
The Palace of Westminster

The Parliamentary Office of Science and Technology (POST) is an impartial research and knowledge exchange service based in the Parliament of the United Kingdom POST serves both Houses of Parliament (the House of Commons and the House of Lords).

It produces concise briefings focusing on topical issues where the research evidence is emerging or particularly complex. POST briefings provide an overview of the latest research evidence and are produced in consultation with experts and stakeholders. Reports are designed to be used by MPs and Peers and are publicly available on its website.

POST also helps parliament to draw on the expertise of experts and academics and helps academics to understand parliament and contribute to its work.

POST is advised by a Board of parliamentarians, external research experts and senior parliamentary staff.

== History ==
Year	Event
1980s	Office first suggested
1989	POST launched (with charitable funding). Among other support, the UK Centre for Economic and Environmental Development raised funds to provide POST with its first in-house environmental specialist adviser.
1992	POST was adopted as Parliamentary body by both Houses of the UK Parliament and subjected to five year reviews.
2000	The UK Parliament made POST a permanent institution after Dr Ian Gibson MP, POST's Chairman, Lord Flowers - vice-Chairman and Professor David Cope, Director, presented evidence to the then House of Commons Administration Committee to support the decision, which was endorsed later by the House of Lords.

Since 1939, a group of MPs and peers interested in science and technology, through the first parliamentary "All Party Group", the UK Parliamentary and Scientific Committee (P&S), had encouraged UK Parliamentarians to explore the implications of scientific developments for society and public policy. As the UK economy became more dependent on technological progress, and the varied effects of technology (especially on the environment) became more apparent, it was felt that UK Parliament needed its own resources on such issues. Parliamentarians not only required access to knowledge and insights into the implications of technology for their constituents and society, but also needed to exercise their scrutiny functions over UK government legislation and administration. This thinking was also influenced by the fact that specialised parliamentary science and technology organisations already existed overseas.

P&S members (Sir Ian Lloyd MP, Sir Trevor Skeet MP, Sir Gerry Vaughan MP, Lords Kennet, Gregson and Flowers among others) visited already established organisations in the US, Germany and France, and this reinforced their view that modern Parliaments needed their own ‘intelligence’ on science and technology-related issues. Initially, they asked the then Thatcher government to fund such services at Westminster but were asked first to demonstrate a real need. This led to the P&S creating a charitable foundation to raise funds from P&S members.

The parliamentary reaction was positive and led to the appointment of a first Director, Dr Michael Norton. In 1989, POST was formally established as a charitable foundation, though not an internal part of Parliament.

POST had attracted more resources by 1992 and then recruited 3 specialist science advisers and began its fellowship programme with the UK research councils.

In 1992, the House of Commons Information Committee, supported by the House of Lords, recommended that Parliament should itself fund POST for 3 years, and a subsequent review in 1995 extended this for a further 5 years. This was the result of POST demonstrating real interest and demand from MPs and peers.

POST's financial reliance on donations from bodies external to Parliament, even those as prestigious as the Royal Society, had always slightly compromised the perceived independence of the office.

In 2000, both Houses decided that POST should be established as a permanent bicameral institution, funded exclusively by Parliament.

In 2009, POST celebrated its 20th anniversary with, among other events, a conference on "Images of the Future". The keynote participants were the Hon. Bart Gordon, Chair of the US House of Representatives' Committee on Science and Technology and Dr Jim Dator of the University of Hawaii Futures Research Centre, along with many other Members and staff of Parliaments across the world.

Year	Director/Head of POST
1989	Dr Michael Norton
1998	Professor David Cope
2012	Dr Chris Tyler
2017	Dr Chandrika Nath
2018	Dr Grant Hill-Cawthorne
2021	Oliver Bennett MBE

== Board Chairs ==
Name	Start	End	Party	Constituency
Michael Spicer	1 April 1991	1 April 1993	Conservative	South Worcestershire
Michael Clark	1 April 1993	8 April 1997	Conservative	Rochford
Ashok Kumar	1997	1 March 1998	Labour	Middlesbrough South and East Cleveland
Ian Gibson	2 March 1998	1 May 2002	Labour	Norwich North
Adam Afriyie	16 November 2010	30 May 2024	Conservative	Windsor
Lauren Sullivan	4 February 2025	present	Labour	Gravesham

== Activities ==
=== Science and technology in parliament ===
Most parliamentarians do not have a scientific or technological background but science and technology issues are increasingly integral to public policy. Parliamentarians are bombarded daily with lobbying, public enquiries and media stories about science and technology. These cover diverse areas such as medical advances, environmental issues and global communications. POST helps parliamentarians examine such issues effectively by providing information resources, in depth analysis and impartial advice. POST works closely with a wide range of organisations involved in science and technology, including select committees, all-party parliamentary groups, government departments, scientific societies, policy think tanks, business, academia and research funders.

=== Aim ===
POST informs parliamentary debate through:

- impartial, non-partisan, timely and peer-reviewed research
- helping Parliament to access experts and evidence
- identifying emerging areas of interest to Parliament through horizon scanning
- supporting the exchange of information and expertise between researchers and the UK Parliament through fellowships and other knowledge exchange activities

=== How POST works ===
POST authors and the Head of POST are responsible for deciding what topics to produce briefings on, sometimes in consultation with parliamentary colleagues and the POST Board. Decisions on what to publish are informed by the resources available to the team, as well as the following factors:

- parliamentary business
- questions from parliamentarians
- new and topical issues
- research advances and developments
- developments in policy areas

Briefings are produced following a process involving a literature review, consultation with experts and stakeholders, and peer review.

=== International activities ===
POST liaises with science and technology organisations across the world.

POST is a member of the European Parliamentary Technology Assessment network, which brings together parliamentary organisations throughout Europe sharing information and working on joint projects.

== The POST Board ==
The POST Board provides advice on POST's objectives, outputs and future work programme. It meets quarterly. The Board comprises:

- six members of the House of Commons, including the Chair of the Science, Innovation and Technology Committee. Members roughly reflect the balance of parties in Parliament.
- four members of the House of Lords, including the Chair of the Science and Technology Committee
- four leading non-parliamentarians from the science and technology community, typically drawn from the four national academies
- senior parliamentary staff

=== Officers ===
- Chair: Dr Lauren Sullivan
- Vice-Chairman: Lord Ravensdale
- Head: Oliver Bennett MBE

=== House of Lords ===
- Professor the Lord Winston
- Lord Mair
- Lord Haskel

=== House of Commons ===
- Chi Onwurah MP
- Chris Curtis MP
- Adam Thompson MP
- George Freeman MP
- Ian Sollom MP

=== Externals ===
- Professor Elizabeth Fisher
- Professor Susan Owens
- Paul Martynenko, FBCS
- Professor Sir Bernard Silverman, FRS, FAcSS

=== Ex Officio Board Members ===
Senior parliamentary officials, including Grant Hill-Cawthorne The House of Commons Librarian and Managing Director Research & Information, House of Commons.

== Staff ==
=== Permanent staff ===
POST has eight science advisers, covering the fields of biology and health; physical sciences and digital; environment and energy; and social sciences. Science advisers generally have a postgraduate qualification and science policy experience.

POST has four knowledge exchange professionals grouped as the Knowledge Exchange Unit.

=== Fellows ===
POST runs fellowship schemes with scientific societies and research councils, whereby PhD students and academics can spend three months or more working in parliament.

== See also ==
- Ashok Kumar (British politician)
- Parliamentary and Scientific Committee
