= Mutual shaping =

Technology design concept

Mutual shaping suggests that society and technology are not mutually exclusive to one another and, instead, influence and shape each other. This process is a combination of social determinism and technological determinism. The term mutual shaping was developed through science and technology studies (STS) in an attempt to explain the detailed process of technological design. Mutual shaping is argued to have a more comprehensive understanding of the development of new media because it considers technological and social change as directly affecting the other.

== Comparison of TD and SD ==
Technological determinism (TD), coined by Thorstein Veblen, suggests that technology is the primary catalyst for change in society. Following this theory, the development and implementation of technology is beyond the control of society as it is pervasive in all elements of our lives. Once a technology has been created its influence on society is an inevitable, predetermined path. Technological deterministic view suggests that technology is the cause of societal change, which shapes humans and their environments. An example that supports technological determinism is the development of the printing press that accelerated the Protestant Reformation.

In contrast, social determinism (SD), popularized by social theorists Karl Marx and Emile Durkheim, purports that social structure is the driving factor towards change in society. Following this view, society is the governing force that determines social behaviour, and technology is created and adapted based on society's wants and needs. Social determinism has been observed as response to technological determinism and explains that it is social and environmental factors which determine how technology is used and progresses.

Both TD and SD are cause-and-effect theories suggesting that technology and society are mutually exclusive. The theory of mutual shaping suggests that technology design is a result of a synthesis of TD and SD. It sees technology and society working together to facilitate change. Society changes as a direct result of the implementation of technology that has been created based on society's wants and needs. They function collectively to shape one another.

== Examples ==
Technology innovations have long been tied to social changes. The move to an industrial society from an agricultural society meant that people had to adjust their social interactions. Agricultural societies have a few, distant and long-term relationships with people, while industrial societies have more casual, short-term relationships.

Technological innovations also don't work in isolation from social change and vice versa. For example, while the telephone was initially invented as an extension of the telegraph, with a focus on business, the telephone quickly became a popular way for people to chat socially. Telephone companies then began to make innovations to enhance social interactions.

== In social networks ==
Mutual shaping is exemplified through the integration of online social networking platforms into daily life. They are a communications technology designed to complement pre-existing methods of communication, such as the phone or in-person conversations, that have become more convenient and/or affordable than their predecessors. TD would argue that these communication technologies have directly influenced our networking capabilities due to their accessibility. Without them we would not be able to conduct business or maintain friendships over long distances. SD would argue that these platforms were created as a result of a need to facilitate communication over long distances. Mutual shaping supports both of these arguments, believing that the two cannot be separated. Social networking platforms display how technology and society are inextricably linked as they work together towards the advancement of one another, exemplifying the theory of mutual shaping.

== The Negative Impact ==
The impact of mutual shaping has not always been positive. When the printing press was first introduced, many were worried about the information overload it might cause. Recently, Internet addiction, or problematic internet use (PIU), has become a widespread issue. PIU can cause lack of sleep due to internet usage as well as increasing the risk for certain physical ailments like eyestrain. Smartphones allow for endless amounts of information to be accessible in the pockets of its users. However, the social stigma around smartphone use has centered around how technology addiction can lead to increased stress and anxiety for the users.

== Push-Pull-Thinking ==
Push-Pull-Thinking can be understood by the application of how new technology is created. When new demand for a product is the driving factor behind its creation then it is the "pulled" method, while when a new technology enters the market with new possibilities for application or innovation then it is the "push method."

=== Examples ===
According to Michael Haddad, it's easier to understand an example of Push-Pull-Thinking where technology is the driving factor as one from an engineering or research and development background. Sony's Walkman personal stereo cassette player has also been stated as an example of a technology push where there was no market need.

In cases of Push-Pull-Thinking, where demand is the driving factor, the needs or requirements of society or market its best to take a market research approach to innovation. Innovations regarding safety are often seen as pulled innovations with car airbags and new medical advancements are usually listed as examples.
