= Rathenau Institute =

Institute for technology assessment in the Netherlands

- Formation: 1986; 40 years ago
- Website: www.rathenau.nl
- Formerly called: Netherlands Organisation for Technology Assessment

The Rathenau Institute (Dutch: Rathenau Instituut) is an organisation in the Netherlands for technology assessment. It is a member of the European Parliamentary Technology Assessment.

The Institute was formed in 1986 as the Netherlands Organisation for Technology Assessment (Dutch: Nederlandse Organisatie van Technologisch Aspectenonderzoek). It was formed by the Minister of Education and Sciences on the recommendation of a commission led by Gerhart Wolfgang Rathenau. In 1994, several years after the death of Rathenau in 1989, it was renamed to the Rathenau Institute and relocated within the Royal Netherlands Academy of Arts and Sciences.
