= European Parliamentary Technology Assessment =

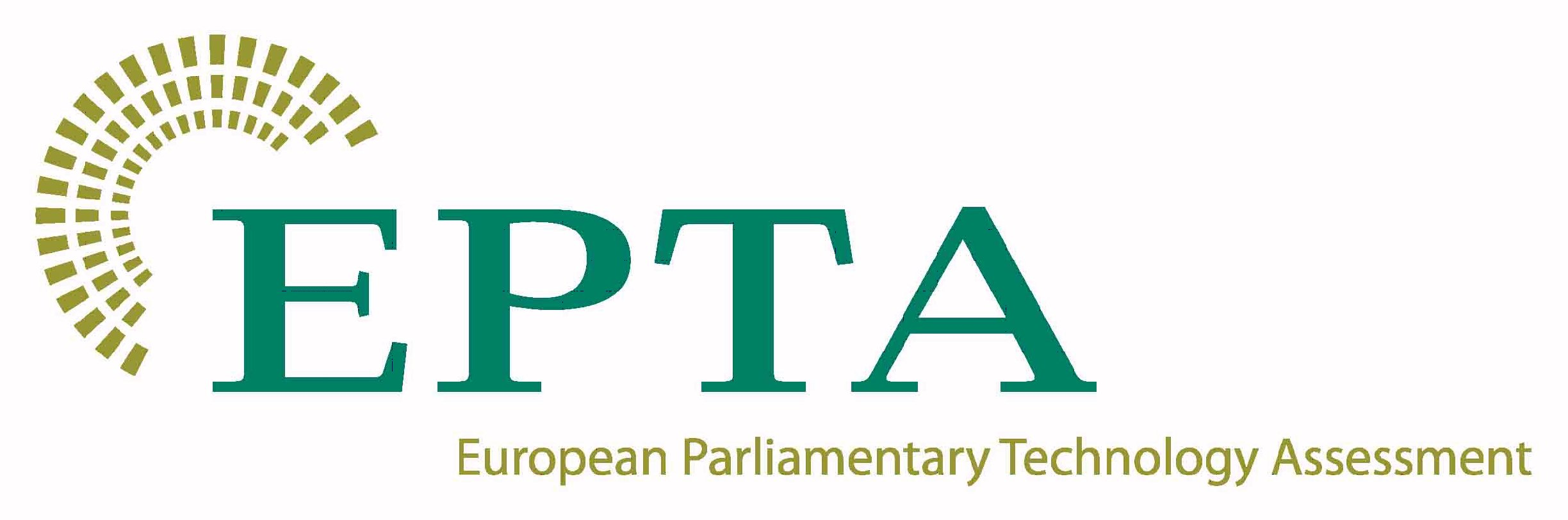
Logo

The European Parliamentary Technology Assessment (EPTA) is a network of technology assessment (TA) institutions specialising in advising parliamentary bodies in Europe.

== Objectives ==
The EPTA partners advise parliaments on the possible social, economic and environmental impact of new sciences and technologies. The common aim is to provide impartial and high quality analysis and reports of developments in issues such as for example bioethics and biotechnology, public health, environment and energy, ICTs, and R&D policy. Such work is seen as an aid to the democratic control of scientific and technological innovations, and was pioneered in the 1970s by the Office of Technology Assessment (OTA) of the US Congress. EPTA aims to advance the establishment of technology assessment (TA) as an integral part of policy formation in parliamentary decision-making processes in Europe, and to strengthen the links between TA units in Europe.

== History and organization ==
The EPTA network was formally established in 1990, on a recommendation by the UK's parliamentary TA office – Parliamentary Office of Science and Technology, under the patronage of the President of the European Parliament, Mr Enrique Baron Crespo. The network has a light structure, guided by the EPTA Council and by meetings of the Directors of the EPTA partner organizations. The EPTA Council is the steering committee of the EPTA network, and consists of Members of Parliament or representatives of the advisory boards for the respective EPTA organization. The Council decides on organizational matters such as co-operation within the network and the status of members and associates. The Presidency of EPTA rotates among full members each year. The tasks of the EPTA member organization holding the presidency are to coordinate the EPTA network activities and to host the annual EPTA conference, Council meeting and Directors' meeting.

== Members ==
Parliamentary TA is institutionalized in different ways, ranging from permanent parliamentary committees for TA; separate TA units as part of the parliamentary administration; to independent institutions with a mandate to serve as a permanent consulting institution for the parliament. The members of the EPTA network are European organizations, which carry out TA studies on behalf of parliaments. Full membership can be obtained by a unit that operates in Europe, is devoted to TA or related activities, serves a (supra-national, national or regional) parliament, has its own budget and secretariat and has an active work program including publications on issues with a scientific and technological component. Associate membership can be granted to other TA units that have a TA program and the resources to realize it, but that do not fulfill other criteria for full membership. Associates are involved in all EPTA activities but are not represented in the EPTA Council. Further, other units interested in the work of EPTA can act as observers.

According to the official EPTA homepage, there are currently 14 full members:

- Scientific and Technological Options Assessment (STOA), European Parliament
- Tulevaisuusvaliokunta – Committee for the Future, Finnish Parliament
- Office Parlementaire d'Evaluation des Choix Scientifiques et Technologiques (OPECST) – Parliamentary Office for Evaluation of Scientific and Technological Options, Assemblée Nationale and Sénat, France
- Büro für Technikfolgen-Abschätzung beim Deutschen Bundestag (TAB) – Office of Technology Assessment at the German Parliament
- Committee on Technology Assessment, Greek Parliament
- Rathenau Instituut, Netherlands
- Teknologirådet – Norwegian Board of Technology (NBT)
- TA-SWISS Foundation for Technology Assessment, Switzerland
- Parliamentary Office of Science and Technology (POST), UK Parliament
- Consell Assessor del Parlament sobre Ciència i Tecnologia (CAPCIT) – The advisory board of the Parliament of Catalonia for Science and Technology
- Utvärderings- och forskningsfunktionen – The Parliamentary evaluation and research unit, Swedish Parliament
- Institute of Technology Assessment (Institut für Technikfolgen-Abschätzung ITA), Austria
- Oficina de Ciencia y Tecnología del Congreso de los Diputados (Oficina C) - The Spanish Parliament Office for Science and Technology
- Cellule Scientifique of the Chambre des Députés (Luxembourg)

According to the official EPTA homepage, there are currently 10 associate members:

- Sub-Committee on Science and Ethics of the Parliamentary Assembly of the Council of Europe, Strasbourg
- Democracy-X (formerly Teknologirådet – Danish Board of Technology Foundation, DBT)
- Biuro Analiz Sejmowych, Kancelaria Sejmu (BAS) – The Bureau of Research, Polish Parliament
- Government Accountability Office (GAO), Center for Science, Technology and Engineering (CSTE) of the US Congress
- Spiral research centre – Université de Liège
- Observatory of Technology Assessment at CICS.NOVA research centre – Universidade Nova de Lisboa
- Parliamentary Technical Advisory (ATP) of the Library of the National Congress of Chile
- Research and Legislative Reference Bureau (RLRB), National Diet Library (NDL)
- National Assembly Futures Institute (NAFI) of South Korea
- Committee for the Future of the Parliament of the Republic of Lithuania

== Activities ==
EPTA organizes annual conferences targeted at Members of Parliaments and actively promotes collaboration between members and associates, including common projects occasionally. On the EPTA homepage an encompassing database lists and summarizes all TA projects of the member institutions.

== See also ==
- Parliamentary Office of Science and Technology (POST)
