= Catherine Waldby =

Australian sociologist (born 1957)

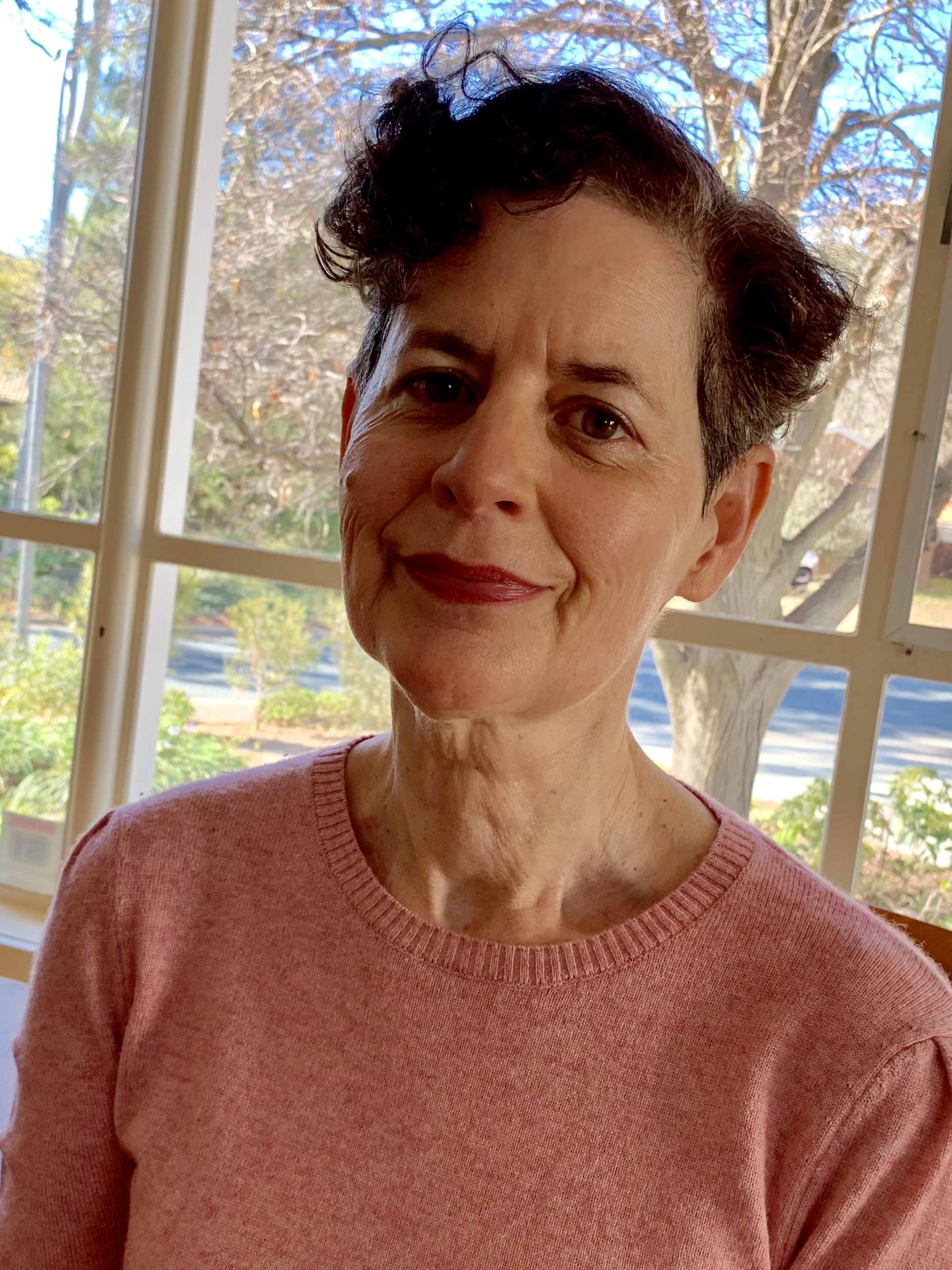
- Born: 18 September 1957 (age 69); Queensland, Australia
- Occupation: Sociologist

Academic background
- Education: University of Queensland (BA); Sydney University (MA); Murdoch University (PhD)

Catherine Waldby (born 18 September 1957) is an Australian sociologist focused on social studies of biomedicine and the life sciences. She is a research professor in the School of Sociology at Australian National University. She is a senior editor of the journal BioSocieties and an elected fellow of the Academy of Social Sciences in Australia.

== Early life and education ==
Waldby was born 18 September 1957. She completed her B.A. at the University of Queensland and her M.A. at Sydney University. Later, she received her Ph.D. in Social Sciences from Murdoch University.

== Career ==
From 1999 to 2001, Waldby worked as a deputy director of the National Centre in HIV Social Research at the University of New South Wales. Subsequently, she directed the Centre for Research in Innovation, Culture and Technology at the Brunel University of London, which she maintained until 2004. Between 2004 and 2006, she was appointed as a senior lecturer at the University of New South Wales. In 2006, she assumed the professorial research fellowship at University of Sydney, a title she held until 2015. Additionally, she held the position of a professor at University of Sydney. From 2015 to 2021, she directed the Research School of Social Sciences at Australian National University, where she has also been a research professor in the School of Sociology.

== Works ==
Waldby's first book AIDS and the Body Politic: Biomedicine and Sexual Difference was published in 1996, wherein she discussed how many of the ideas about HIV and its epidemiology stem from unquestioned assumptions about sexual identity. Dowsett, in his review of the book, stated that the book "represents a significant attempt to build a bridge between science and culture". He also highlighted the possibility of the authors discussed in the book not reading it, citing probable comprehension issues due to the book being "technically written within its discipline". Fran Collyer reviewed the book in Journal of Sociology and called it "highly informative". While addressing the structure of the book, he underscored that it is "overly concerned with covering potential lacuna rather than moving smoothly forward".

In 2006, Waldby co-authored Tissue Economies: Blood, Organs and Cell Lines in Late Capitalism with Robert Mitchell, mapping the transformations of human tissue management from a post-war welfare state to a competition state and commercialized life science industry. Steve Chasin called the book a "valuable contribution to understanding the landscape of today's rapidly developing biotechnology industry". However, he also expressed concern that authors did not present a "neat package of recommendations to address tissue economies". Ruth McManus described the book as "revelatory". She classified the book as a "complex" reading, and expressed that the "book's styles of theoretical engagement vary" and it requires a lot of "work to link the substantive and theoretical elements". Kathryn Russell called the book a "wealth of information about biotechnology and its social context", but pointed out that while the authors are morally concerned about the influence of capitalist profiteering, their theory is not grounded in a "paradigmatically Marxist approach to capital accumulation".

Waldby worked on two new analytic frameworks as well. One of these is elaborated in her book, Clinical Labor: Tissue Donors and Research Subjects in the Global Bioeconomy, co-authored with Melinda Cooper, in which she highlighted a "precarity" approach to these issues that links them to broader concerns around labor rights and protections. In his review of the book, Richard Tutton from the Lancaster University wrote that the book is "impressive array of sources" and "an important contribution to the literature". Kean Birch stated that the authors "have done an admirable job". However, he also said that "the book has some flaws" as the authors "oversell their argument" and "tend to throw everything into the pot at once". Samuel Walker and Adam Mahoney, in their review of the book termed it an "important book for anyone interested in biopolitics and political economy" as it provided a "creative understanding of the post-Fordist regime of labor".

Waldby’s 2019 publication, The Oocyte Economy: The Changing Meaning of Human Eggs, focused on a framework based on gender, consumption and reproductive tissues, considering the ways that women resort to reproductive medical services, particularly oocyte and embryo banking and fertility tourism, to manage their life course. Anna Molas, in her review of the book, remarked, "The book offers a critical understanding of how different techniques, narratives, and expectations materialize in the lives of women who are inevitably shaped by them", while also noting its limitations for the selective representation of "a relatively privileged group of women". Suzana Ignjatović wrote that this book "contributes significantly to the anthropology of kinship and family" through its examination of "modern negotiated mothering practices and emotional labor". She also wrote that a gender perspective is required to understand the equity and fairness concerns raised by potential donors, and her book "lacks an articulated gender perspective". According to Jane Maienschein of Arizona State University, the book "proceeds thematically" and is "well-written and well-structured" but lacks the "prospects for other even newer forms of technology", for instance, "artificial gametogenesis". Rosanna Hertz described her book a "thought-provoking" and "original examination" about the meaning of oocytes. However, she also mentioned that the amount we can learn from Waldby's "interviews is limited", calling the conducted in-depth interviews less "strategically diverse".

== Awards and honors ==
- 2010 – Fellow of the Academy of the Social Sciences in Australia

== Bibliography ==
=== Books ===
- Waldby, Catherine (2003). AIDS and the Body Politic: Biomedicine and Sexual Difference. Taylor & Francis. ISBN 9781134768424.
- Waldby, Catherine (2003). The Visible Human Project: Informatic Bodies and Posthuman Medicine. Taylor & Francis. ISBN 9781134687992.
- Mitchell, Robert; Waldby, Catherine (2006). Tissue Economies: Blood, Organs and Cell Lines in Late Capitalism. Duke University Press. ISBN 9780822388043.
- Gottweis, H.; Salter, B.; Waldby, C. (2009). The Global Politics of Human Embryonic Stem Cell Science: Regenerative Medicine in Transition. Palgrave Macmillan. ISBN 9780230594364.
- Cooper, Melinda; Waldby, Catherine (2014). Clinical Labor: Tissue donors and Research Subjects in the Bioeconomy. Duke University Press. ISBN 9780822377009.
- Cooper, Melinda; Waldby, Cathy; Reuschling, Felicita; Schultz, Susanne (2015). Sie nennen es Leben, wir nennen es Arbeit. Biotechnologie, Reproduktion und Familie im 21. Jahrhundert. Edition Assemblage. ISBN 9783942885867.
- Waldby, Catherine (2019). The Oocyte Economy: The Changing Meaning of Human Egg. Edition Assemblage. ISBN 9781478004721.
