= Roberta Millstein =

Professor of Philosophy

Roberta L. Millstein
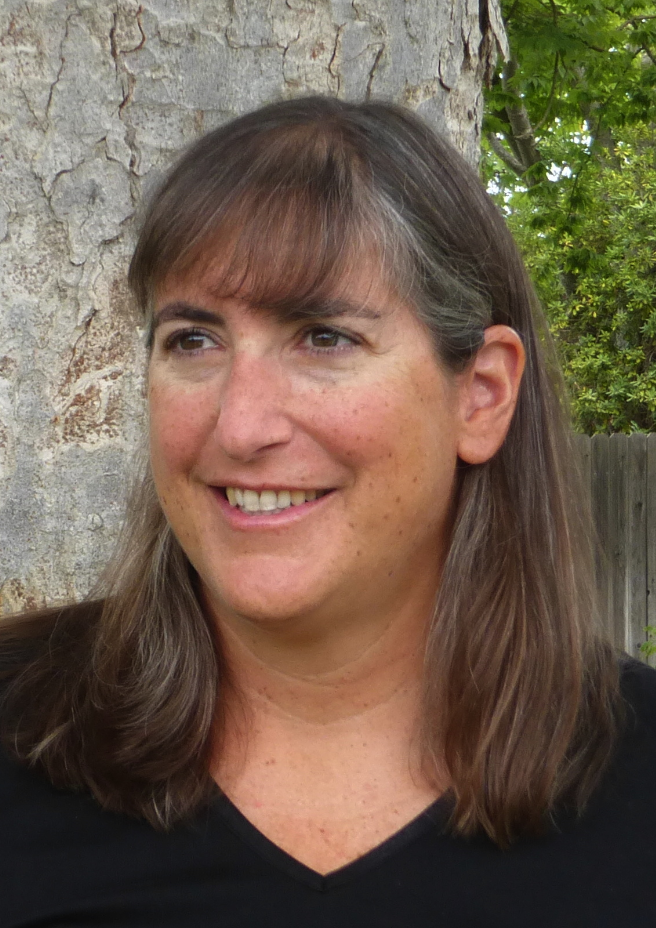
- Education: University of Minnesota
- Occupation: Professor
- Employer: University of California, Davis
- Known for: Philosophy of science, history and philosophy of biology, environmental ethics

Roberta L. Millstein is Professor Emerit of Philosophy at the University of California, Davis, with affiliations in the Science and Technology Studies Program and the John Muir Institute for the Environment. She is the Senior Co-chair of the Philosophy of Science Association’s Women's Caucus and an Editor of the peer-reviewed online open-access journal Philosophy, Theory, and Practice in Biology. She also serves as a member of the executive committee and Council for the American Association for the Advancement of Science, Pacific Division (AAAS-PD) as well as the council for the International Society for the History, Philosophy, and Social Studies of Biology (ISHPSSB).

Millstein's primary research is in the history and philosophy of biology and environmental ethics Millstein's work on the concepts of natural selection and random genetic drift is widely cited. She wrote the authoritative entry on genetic drift in the Stanford Encyclopedia of Philosophy.

== Education and career ==
Millstein earned her A.B. in Philosophy and Computer Science from Dartmouth College in 1988 and her M.A. and Ph.D. in Philosophy (with a minor in the History of Science and Technology) from the University of Minnesota, Twin Cities in 1997. Millstein taught in the Philosophy Department at California State University, East Bay from 1997 to 2006, serving as Interim Chair in 2005–2006, and she was a Visiting Associate Professor in the Department of History and Philosophy of Science at the University of Pittsburgh in 2005. Millstein teaches at the University of California, Davis, where she has been since 2006.

While in graduate school, Millstein studied under John Beatty and C. Kenneth Waters. She has co-authored with Michael R. Dietrich and Robert A. Skipper, Jr.

In 2020, Millstein retired from teaching, but is still active in research

== Research Areas ==
Millstein is best known for her claim that within evolutionary theory, natural selection can be distinguished from random genetic drift if both are properly understood as causal processes rather than outcomes. She is also known for the claim that natural selection is a population-level causal process but (in a paper co-authored with Robert A. Skipper, Jr.) that current philosophical accounts of mechanisms do not capture it well. Her work on the concepts of population and metapopulation has been described as exemplifying an approach where biology and philosophy work as equal disciplinary contributors. Her recent co-edited volume ‘’Mechanism and Causality in Biology and Economics’’ (with Hsiang-Ke Chao and Szu-Ting Chen) has been called a “collection of excellent essays” with “novel subject matter”; her own essay in the book is described as a “model of clarity.”

== Selected publications ==
- Millstein, Roberta L. (2002), “Are Random Drift and Natural Selection Conceptually Distinct?” Biology and Philosophy 17(1):33-53.
- Skipper, Robert A. and Millstein, Roberta L. (2005) “Thinking about Evolutionary Mechanisms: Natural Selection,” Studies in History and Philosophy of Biological and Biomedical Sciences, 36(2): 327–347. Special edition on Mechanisms in Biology, edited by C.F. Craver and L. Darden.
- Millstein, Roberta L. (2006), “Natural Selection as a Population-Level Causal Process,” The British Journal for the Philosophy of Science 57(4): 627–653.
- Millstein, Roberta L. (2008), “Distinguishing Drift and Selection Empirically: 'The Great Snail Debate' of the 1950s,” Journal of the History of Biology 41: 339–367.
- Dietrich, Michael R. and Millstein, Roberta L. (2008), “The Role of Causal Processes in the Neutral and Nearly Neutral Theories,” Philosophy of Science 75 (5): 548–559.
- Millstein, Roberta L., Skipper, Robert A., and Dietrich, Michael R. (2009), “(Mis)interpreting Mathematical Models: Drift as a Physical Process,” Philosophy and Theory in Biology 1:e002.
- Millstein, Roberta L. (2010), “The Concepts of Population and Metapopulation in Evolutionary Biology and Ecology” in M. A. Bell, D. J. Futuyma, W. F. Eanes, and J. S. Levinton (eds.), Evolution Since Darwin: The First 150 Years, Sunderland, MA: Sinauer, 61–86.
- Millstein, Roberta L. (2012), “Darwin's Explanation of Races by Means of Sexual Selection,” Studies in History and Philosophy of Biological and Biomedical Sciences 43: 627–633.
- Chao, Hsiang-Ke, Chen, Szu-Ting, and Millstein, Roberta L. (Eds.), Mechanism and Causality in Biology and Economics, History, Philosophy and Theory of the Life Sciences, Vol. 3, Springer, 2013.
- Millstein, Roberta L. (2024) The Land Is Our Community: Aldo Leopold’s Environmental Ethic for the New Millennium. Chicago: University of Chicago Press.
