= Maienschein =

Maienschein is a surname. Notable people with the surname include:

- Brian Maienschein, American politician
- Jane Maienschein (born 1950), American scientist
