= George Gale (academic) =

Philosopher of science and viticulturalist

George D. Gale

George D. Gale (August 10, 1943 –– ) is an American historian and philosopher of science, who has worked in 17th Century physics, particularly Gottfried Wilhelm Leibniz, the subject of a book-length commentary, philosophy of modern cosmology, introducing anthropic principle cosmology and Many Worlds theory to the wider community. Working with the physicist John Urani, a series of papers re-writing the history of modern cosmology was published, demonstrating the central role played by the cosmologist A. E. Milne. One of their papers was chosen as an "Editor's Choice: Paper of 1998-2001" in the American Journal of Physics. Following this, Gale turned his attention to the history and philosophy of agriculture, specifically viticulture—based upon his earlier experiences as a vineyard and winery owner, and wine columnist for the Kansas City Star. His book on the phylloxera disaster devastating vineyards worldwide was a finalist for several awards. He continues his work in viticultural research and consulting.

== Biography ==
Gale attended Santa Clara University, graduating with a BA in Philosophy. Gale worked summers at Aerojet on the Minuteman missile program during this time. In Fall 1965 Gale began a master's program at San Francisco State, and teaching and administering the lab students in the Woodrow Wilson High School's Lux Laboratory Enrichment Program. He graduated in 1967 with a thesis directed by Russel Kahl, "'Explanation' in Emile Meyerson's Identity and Reality.'"

At this time, Gale became the executive secretary and manager of the Ford Foundation project "Study Group on the Unity of Knowledge", whose principal investigators were Michael Polanyi and Marjorie Grene. The project was housed at UC Davis where Gale would later become a PhD student.

In 1970, Gale moved temporarily from Davis to Oxford to work on his dissertation with Rom Harré.

In Fall of 1971, Gale accepted appointment as assistant professor of physical science and philosophy at the University of Missouri–Kansas City, where he would remain for the next 43 years.

In 1979 he published Theory of Science: An Introduction to the History, Philosophy, and Logic of Science. The book was one of the first introductory texts to base its philosophical development in fully integrated, extensive historical examples. In 1981 Gale published in Scientific American the first article introducing the anthropic cosmological principle to the general public.

In 1988, Gale received a National Science Foundation grant to research the origins of big bang cosmology.

In 1996 Gale became the second Executive Secretary/CEO in the history of e Philosophy of Science Association.

In 2011 Gale's Dying on the Vine: How Phylloxera Transformed Wine was published by the University of California Press. The book was well received.

In 2011 Gale was named James C. Olson Professor of Philosophy. He retired from UMKC as emeritus in 2014.
