= Ilina Singh =

British academic

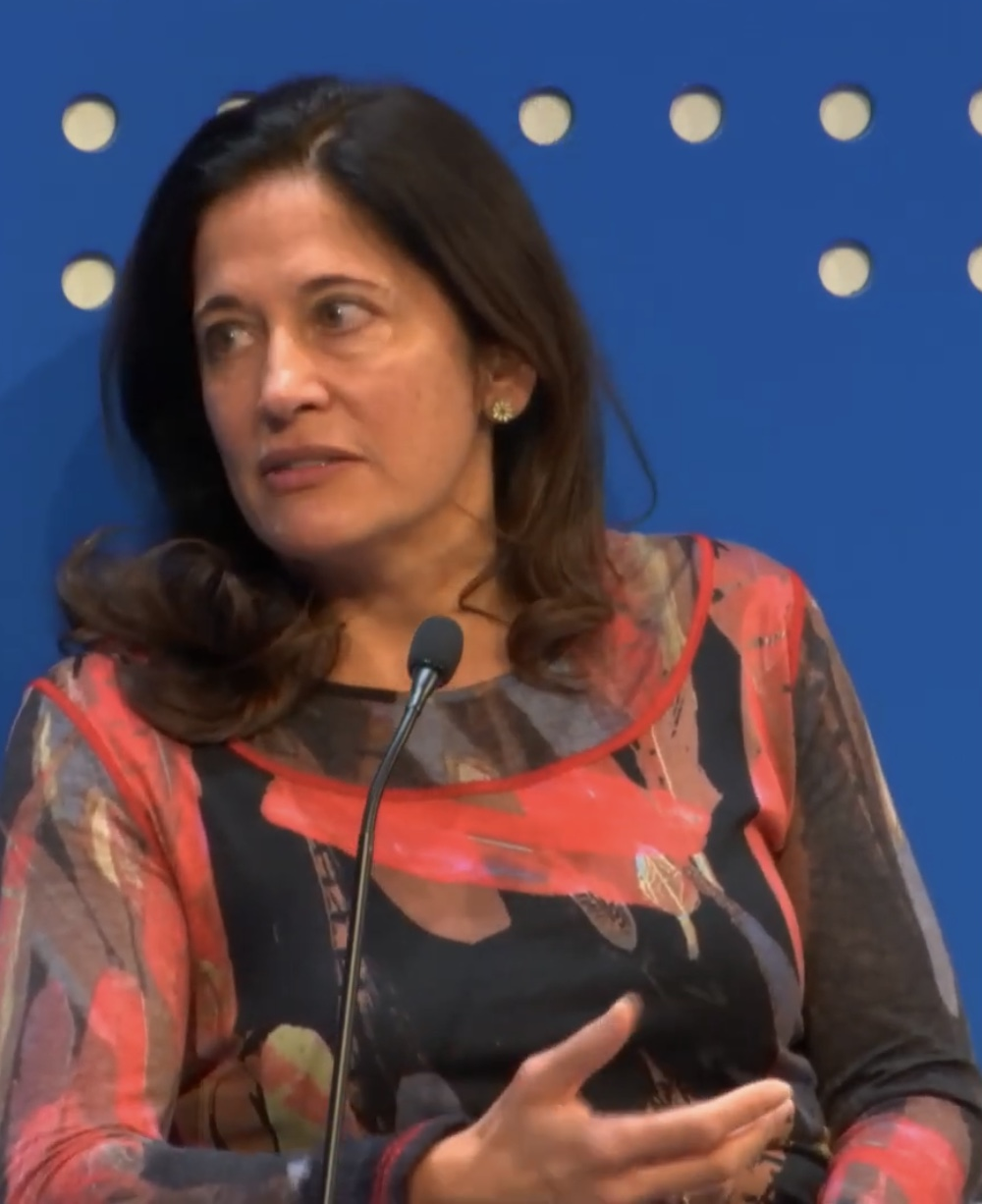
- Singh in 2020

Ilina Singh is a Professor of Neuroscience & Society at the University of Oxford, England, United Kingdom. She is also a co-director at the Wellcome Trust Centre for Ethics and the Humanities, and a research fellow at the National Institute for Health Research (NIHR) Oxford Health Biomedical Research Centre.

== Research career ==
Singh obtained a PhD from Harvard University. Before joining at the University of Oxford, she was a professor of Science, Ethics & Society at the Department of Global Health & Social Medicine at the King's College London (KCL), England, UK. Singh was a Reader at the London School of Economics and Political Science before joining KCL. Her current research focuses on the social and ethical side of neuroscience and psychiatry. She is interested in studying translational impacts for children and families, and developing qualitative and quantitative methods of data collection & presentation. According to Scopus, Singh has published more than 88 research documents with over 2000 citations, and currently has an h-index of 23.

=== International policy-making board member ===
- Scattergood Foundation Program for Behavioral Health Ethics, University of Pennsylvania Medical School, USA.
- ELSA programme of the Norwegian Research Council.

=== Consultant to health policy groups ===
- UK National Institute for Clinical Excellence (NICE).
- National Institutes of Health (NIH)/Hastings Center Working Group on Drugs in Pediatric Psychiatry.

=== Editorial activities ===
- Co-Editor: BioSocieties (journal).
- Editorial Board member: The American Journal of Bioethics-Neuroscience (journal).

=== Awards ===
2013: Fellow of the Hastings Centre, the oldest bioethics institution in the world.
