= David Hull (philosopher) =

American philosopher

- Born: June 15, 1935; Burnside, Illinois
- Died: August 11, 2010 (aged 75); Chicago, Illinois
- Partner: Richard "Dick" Wellman

Education
- Education: Illinois Wesleyan University (BS) Indiana University (PhD)

Philosophical work
- Notable ideas: Philosophy of Biology, Species-As-Individuals, Evolutionary Interactors

David Lee Hull (June 15, 1935 – August 11, 2010) was an American philosopher who was most notable for founding the field philosophy of biology. Hull is recognized within evolutionary culture studies as contributing heavily in early discussions of the conceptualization of memetics. In addition to his academic prominence, he was well known as a gay man who fought for the rights of other gay and lesbian philosophers. Hull was partnered with Richard "Dick" Wellman, a Chicago school teacher, until Wellman's passing during the drafting of Science as Process.

== Education and career ==
Hull initially got a bachelor's degree in biology at Illinois Wesleyan University. He then became one of the first graduates of the History and Philosophy of Science department at Indiana University Bloomington. After earning his PhD from IU, he taught at the University of Wisconsin–Milwaukee for 20 years before moving to Northwestern, where he taught for another 20 years. Hull was a former president of the Philosophy of Science Association, the International Society for the History, Philosophy, and Social Studies of Biology (ISHPSSB), and the Society for Systematic Biology. He was particularly well known for his argument that species are not sets or collections but rather spatially and temporally extended individuals (also called the individuality thesis or "species-as-individuals" thesis).

He is considered to have founded and systematically developed the area of philosophy of biology as it is understood in contemporary philosophy. Hull proposed an elaborate discussion of science as an evolutionary process in his 1988 book, which also offered a historical account of the "taxonomy wars" of the 1960s and 1970s between three competing schools of taxonomy: phenetics, evolutionary systematics, and cladistics. In Hull's view, science evolves like organisms and populations do, with a demic population structure, subject to selection for ideas based on "conceptual inclusive credit." Either novelty or citation of work gives credit, and the professional careers of scientists share in credit by using successful research. This is a "hidden hand" account of scientific progress.

Additionally, Hull regularly contributed to a variety of studies of evolutionary culture. He contributed to philosophical and empirical accounts of the evolution of science and evolutionary epistemology. While most of his work is in metaphysics and epistemology of evolution and biology, some of his work is closely related to what has since been called Bibliometrics, Scientometrics, or Science of Science. He forwarded citation analysis to develop an account of the evolutionary survival of scientific ideas which has a direct relationship to what has been called Knowledge Memes or Science Memes.

He also contributed to evolutionary culture theory more broadly by contributing to initial discussions surrounding the generalization of Richard Dawkins' evolutionary vehicles in memetics research. In relation to Richard Dawkins' theory of replicators, Hull introduced the notion of interactors.

He was Dressler Professor in the Humanities Emeritus at Northwestern University.

== Bibliography ==
- Hull, D. L. (1964) Consistency and monophyly. Systematic Zoology 13: pages 1–11.
- Hull, D. L. (1965) The effect of essentialism on taxonomy: two thousand years of stasis. The British Journal for the Philosophy of Science 15: Pages 314–326; 16: pages 1–18.
- Hull, D. L. (1966) Phylogenetic numericlature. Systematic Zoology 15: pages 14–17.
- Hull, D. L. (1967) Certainty and circularity in evolutionary taxonomy. Evolution 21: pages 174–189.
- Hull, D. L. (1968) The operational imperative—sense and nonsense in operationalism. Systematic Zoology 17: pages 438–457.
- Hull, D. L. (1969) Morphospecies and biospecies: a reply to Ruse. The British Journal for the Philosophy of Science 20: pages 280–282.
- Hull, D. L. (1970) Contemporary systematic philosophies. Annual Review of Ecology, Evolution, and Systematics 1: pages 19–54.
- Hull, D. L. (1973) Darwin and His Critics: The Reception of Darwin's Theory of Evolution by the Scientific Community. Cambridge, Massachusetts: Harvard University Press; reprinted by the University of Chicago Press, 1983, ISBN 9780226360461.
- Hull, D. L. (1974) Philosophy of Biological Science. Englewood Cliffs: Prentice-Hall, ISBN 9780136636090; translated into Portuguese (1975), Japanese (1994).
- Hull, D. L. (1976) Are species really individuals? Systematic Zoology 25: pages 174–191.
- Hull, D. L. (1978) A matter of individuality. Philosophy of Science. 45: pages 335–360.
- Hull, D. L. (1978) The principles of biological classification: the use and abuse of philosophy. Volume 2, pages 130–153. Proceedings of the Biennial Meeting of the Philosophy of Science Association.
- Hull, D. L. (1979) The limits of cladism. Systematic Zoology 28: pages 416–440.
- Hull, D. L. (1980) Individuality and selection. Annual Review of Ecology, Evolution, and Systematics 11: pages 311–332.
- Hull, D. L. (1981) Kitts and Kitts and Caplan on species. Philosophy of Science 48: pages 141–152.
- Hull, D. L. (1981) Metaphysics and common usage. Behavioral and Brain Sciences 4: pages 290–291.
- Hull, D. L. (1983) Karl Popper and Plato's metaphor. pages 177–189 in N. I. Platnick, and V. A. Funk, eds. Advances in Cladistics, Volume 2 Columbia University Press, New York.
- Hull, D. L. (1983) Thirty-one years of Systematic Zoology. Systematic Zoology 32: pages 315–342.
- Hull, D. L. (1984) Cladistic theory: hypotheses that blur and grow. pages 5–23 in T. Duncan, and T. F. Stuessy, eds. Cladistics: perspectives on the reconstruction of evolutionary history. Columbia University Press, New York.
- Hull, D. L. (1984) Can Kripke alone save essentialism? A reply to Kitts. Systematic Zoology 33: pages 110–112.
- Hull, D. L. (1988) Science as a Process: An Evolutionary Account of the Social and Conceptual Development of Science Chicago: University of Chicago Press, ISBN 9780226360515.
- Hull, D. L. (1989) The Metaphysics of Evolution. Stony Brook, New York: State University of New York Press, ISBN 9780791402122.
- Hull, D. L. (1992) "Review of The Scientific Attitude" Current Comments 15 (September 28): pages 149–154.
- Hull, D. L. (1997) The ideal species concept—and why we can't get it. pages 357–380 in M. F. Claridge, H. A. Dawah, and M. R. Wilson, eds. Species: the units of biodiversity. Chapman & Hall, London.
- Hull, D. L. (1999) The use and abuse of Sir Karl Popper. Biology & Philosophy 14: pages 481–504.
- Hull, D. L. (1999) "Evolutionists red in tooth and claw" Nature, 398 (April): page 385.
- Hull, D. L. (2000) "Activism, scientists and sociobiology" Nature 407 (6805): pages 673–674.
- Hull, D. L. (2001) "Replicators and interactors" In his Science and Selection. Cambridge, United Kingdom: Cambridge University Press, pages 13–32.
- Hull, D. L. (2001) The role of theories in biological systematics. Studies in History and Philosophy of Biological and Biomedical Sciences 32: pages 221–238.
- Hull, D. L. (2002) Words and words about species. Evolution 56: pages 426–428.
- Hull, D. L. (2002a) "A career in the glare of public acclaim" Bioscience 52 (September): pages 837–841.
- Hull, D. L. (2002b) "Explanatory styles in science" American Scientist, September.
- Hull, D. L., R. Langman and S. Glenn (2001) "A general account of selection: biology, immunology and behavior" Behavioral and Brain Sciences 24 (3): pages 511–528.
- Hull, D. L. and M. Ruse, eds., (1998) The Philosophy of Biology Cambridge, United Kingdom: Cambridge University Press, ISBN 9780198752127.

== See also ==
- American philosophy
- List of American philosophers
