= Landecker =

Landecker is a surname. Notable people with the surname include:

- Amy Landecker (born 1969), American actress
- Hannah Landecker (born 1969), American sociologist
- John Records Landecker (born 1947), American disc jockey
