= Unknowability =

Philosophical idea of things impossible to know

In philosophy, unknowability is the possibility of inherently unaccessible knowledge. It addresses the epistemology of that which cannot be known. Some related concepts include the limits of knowledge, ignorabimus, unknown unknowns, the halting problem, and chaos theory.

Nicholas Rescher provides the most recent focused scholarship for this area in Unknowability: An Inquiry into the Limits of Knowledge, where he offered three high level categories, logical unknowability, conceptual unknowability, and in-principle unknowability.

== Background ==
Speculation about what is knowable and unknowable has been part of the philosophical tradition since the inception of philosophy. In particular, Baruch Spinoza's Theory of Attributes argues that a human's finite mind cannot understand infinite substance; accordingly, infinite substance, as it is in itself, is in-principle unknowable to the finite mind.

Immanuel Kant brought focus to unknowability theory in his use of the noumenon concept. He postulated that, while we can know the noumenal exists, it is not itself sensible and must therefore remain unknowable.

Modern inquiry encompasses undecidable problems and questions such as the halting problem, which in their very nature cannot be possibly answered. This area of study has a long and somewhat diffuse history as the challenge arises in many areas of scholarly and practical investigations.

== Rescher's categories of unknowability ==
Rescher organizes unknowability in three major categories:

- logical unknowability — arising from abstract considerations of epistemic logic.
- conceptual unknowability — analytically demonstrable of unknowability based on concepts and involved.
- in-principle unknowability — based on fundamental principles.

In-principle unknowability may also be due to a need for more energy and matter than is available in the universe to answer a question, or due to fundamental reasons associated with the quantum nature of matter. In the physics of special and general relativity, the light cone marks the boundary of physically knowable events.

== The halting problem and the Diophantine problem ==
The halting problem – namely, the problem of determining if arbitrary computer programs will ever finish running – is a prominent example of an unknowability associated with the established mathematical field of computability theory. In 1936, Alan Turing proved that the halting problem is undecidable. This means that there is no algorithm that can take as input a program and determine whether it will halt. In 1970, Yuri Matiyasevich proved that the Diophantine problem (closely related to Hilbert's tenth problem) is also undecidable by reducing it to the halting problem. This means that there is no algorithm that can take as input a Diophantine equation and always determine whether it has a solution in integers.

The undecidability of the halting problem and the Diophantine problem has a number of implications for mathematics and computer science. For example, it means that there is no general algorithm for proving that a given mathematical statement is true or false. It also means that there is no general algorithm for finding solutions to Diophantine equations.

In principle, many problems can be reduced to the halting problem. See the list of undecidable problems.

Gödel's incompleteness theorems demonstrate the implicit in-principle unknowability of methods to prove consistency and completeness of foundation mathematical systems.

== Related concepts ==
There are various graduations of unknowability associated with frameworks of discussion. For example:

- unknowability to particular individual humans (due to individual limitations);
- unknowability to humans at a particular time (due to lack of appropriate tools);
- unknowability to humans due to limits of matter and energy in the universe that might be required to conduct the appropriate experiments or conduct the calculations required;
- unknowability to any processes, organism, or artifact.

Treatment of knowledge has been wide and diverse. Wikipedia itself is an initiative to capture and record knowledge using contemporary technological tools. Earlier attempts to capture and record knowledge include writing deep tracts on specific topics as well as the use of encyclopedias to organize and summarize entire fields or event the entirety of human knowledge.

=== Limits of knowledge ===
An associated topic that comes up frequently is that of Limits of Knowledge. As far as the amount of knowledge is concerned, each person has a pair of eyes and a pair of ears, and there are only twenty-four hours a day, and the amount of knowledge that can be contacted and grasped is limited.

Examples of scholarly discussions involving limits of knowledge include:

- John Horgan's The End of Science: Facing the Limits of Knowledge in the Twilight of the Scientific Age.
- Tavel Morton's Contemporary Physics and the Limits of Knowledge.
- Christopher Cherniak's Limits for Knowledge.
- Ignoramus et ignorabimus, a Latin maxim meaning "we do not know and will not know", was popularized by the neurophysiologist Emil du Bois-Reymond in an 1872 address on "The Limits of Science," in which he stated that the ultimate nature of mind and matter lay beyond the ken of scientific understanding. Du Bois-Reymond's proclamation irritated David Hilbert, who declared in 1900 at the International Congress of Mathematicians that "in mathematics there is no ignorabimus". The halting problem and the Diophantine Problem eventually were answered, demonstrating in-principle unknowability to some foundational mathematical questions, meaning that du Bois-Reymond's assertion was correct.

Gregory Chaitin discusses unknowability in many of his works.

=== Categories of unknowns ===
Popular discussion of unknowability grew with the use of the phrase There are unknown unknowns by United States Secretary of Defense Donald Rumsfeld at a news briefing on February 12, 2002. In addition to unknown unknowns there are known unknowns and unknown knowns. These category labels appeared in discussion of identification of chemical substances.

=== Chaos theory ===
Chaos theory is a theory of dynamics that argues that, for sufficiently complex systems, even if we know initial conditions fairly well, measurement errors and computational limitations render fully correct long-term prediction impossible, hence guaranteeing ultimate unknowability of physical system behaviors.

=== Epistemic Unknowability ===
Epistemic Unknowability is increasing in visibility as a contemporary research area.

While some forms of unknowability stem from logical contradictions or physical laws, epistemic unknowability refers to truths that may be impossible to know due to the fundamental structure of knowledge, justification, or the cognitive limitations or impairment of knowers. This category explores whether the very act of knowing or the inherent boundaries of our conceptual schemes can render certain propositions unknowable in principle. Key arguments in this area include Fitch's paradox of knowability, the problem of unconceived alternatives advanced by Kyle Stanford, and the thesis of cognitive closure.

Todd Hylton at the Electrical and Computer Engineering Department at UC San Diego recently authored Surfing the Cut: The Uncomputable Nature of Things that explores intersection of thermodynamics and epistemic unknowability.

=== Fitch's Paradox of Knowability ===
A central result in epistemic logic is Fitch's paradox of knowability, which demonstrates a surprising and powerful constraint on what can be known. The paradox purports to show that if all truths are knowable, then all truths must, in fact, be known. This conclusion is derived from minimal assumptions in modal logic and epistemic logic.

=== Problem of Unconceived Alternatives ===
This arises from the philosophy of science, particularly from the work of Kyle Stanford. He argues for a form of scientific anti-realism based on what he calls the "problem of unconceived alternatives". The argument proceeds from a historical induction: in past eras of science, scientists have consistently failed to conceive of the fundamentally distinct scientific theories that would later be accepted.

For example, Newtonian physicists could not conceive of the concepts of spacetime curvature that are central to Einstein's theory of general relativity. Similarly, 19th-century chemists and physicists were unable to imagine the world of quantum mechanics. Stanford argues that we have no reason to believe we are any different from these past scientists. Therefore, it is highly probable that there are successor theories to our own current best theories that are fundamentally different and which we are, at present, unable to even conceive.

This implies a form of in-principle unknowability: if we cannot even formulate or think of a particular scientific theory, we certainly cannot know if it is true. This limit is not due to a lack of data, but a cognitive or conceptual limitation on the range of theoretical possibilities available to us at any given time.

=== Cognitive Closure ===
The thesis of cognitive closure, according to philosopher Colin McGinn, posits that the human mind is biologically limited and may be constitutionally incapable of solving certain philosophical problems. The argument is an extension of a familiar idea in biology: a dog's mind is "closed" to calculus, and a fish's mind is "closed" to the concept of terrestrial life. Their cognitive architectures, shaped by evolution for specific survival needs, do not permit access to these conceptual domains.

McGinn argues that Homo sapiens are likewise a species with a specific, evolved cognitive architecture. It is therefore plausible, if not probable, that this architecture renders certain domains of reality "unknowable" to us. He suggests that deep, intractable philosophical problems, such as the mind–body problem (how consciousness arises from matter) or the problem of free will, might not be problems we are failing to solve due to a lack of cleverness, but problems whose solutions lie outside the bounds of possible human conception.

This form of unknowability is not logical or temporary; it is a permanent, in-principle barrier rooted in our biological nature as knowers. If true, it would mean that certain deep truths about the universe are, and always will be, inaccessible to the human mind.

This is likely to be a pivotal issue associated with Artificial Intelligence (AI) and Superintelligence (SI). Intense debate is currently underway as to whether AI or SI will exceed human abilities due to inherent human cognitive closure.
