= Philip Kitcher =

British philosopher (born 1947)

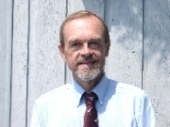
- Kitcher in 2004
- Born: Philip Stuart Kitcher; 20 February 1947 (age 79); London, England
- Spouse: Patricia Kitcher (m. 1971)

Education
- Education: Christ's College, Cambridge; Princeton University
- Thesis: Mathematics and Certainty (1974)
- Doctoral advisor: Paul Benacerraf; Michael Sean Mahoney
- Other advisor: Carl Hempel

Philosophical work
- Era: Contemporary philosophy
- Region: Western philosophy
- School: Analytic philosophy; pragmatism
- Institutions: Vassar College; University of Vermont; University of Minnesota; University of California, San Diego; Columbia University
- Doctoral students: Michael Dietrich; Peter Godfrey-Smith; Kyle Stanford
- Main interests: Philosophy of science; philosophy of biology; bioethics; philosophy of mathematics
- Notable ideas: The distinction between the presuppositional posits and the working posits of a theory; heterogeneous reference potentials (selective realism)

Philip Stuart Kitcher (born 20 February 1947) is a British philosopher who is the John Dewey professor emeritus of philosophy at Columbia University. He specialises in the philosophy of science, the philosophy of biology, the philosophy of mathematics, and more recently pragmatism.

== Life and career ==
Born in London, Kitcher spent his early life in Eastbourne, East Sussex, on the south coast of the United Kingdom, where another distinguished philosopher of an earlier generation (A. J. Ayer) was also at school. Kitcher himself went to school at Christ's Hospital, Horsham, West Sussex. He earned his BA in mathematics/history and philosophy of science from Christ's College, Cambridge, in 1969, and his PhD in history and philosophy of science from Princeton University in 1974, where he worked closely with Carl Hempel and Thomas Kuhn.

Kitcher is currently John Dewey Professor of Philosophy Emeritus at Columbia University. As chair of Columbia's Contemporary Civilization program (part of its undergraduate Core Curriculum), he also held the James R. Barker Professorship of Contemporary Civilization. Before moving to Columbia, Kitcher held tenure-track positions at the University of Vermont, the University of Minnesota, and University of California, San Diego, where he held the position of Presidential Professor of Philosophy.

Kitcher is past president of the American Philosophical Association. In 2002, Kitcher was named a fellow of the American Academy of Arts and Sciences, and he was awarded the inaugural Prometheus Prize from the American Philosophical Association in 2006 in honour of extended achievement in the philosophy of science. He was elected to the American Philosophical Society in 2018. Kitcher was Editor-in-Chief of the journal Philosophy of Science from 1994 to 1999, was also a member of the NIH/DOE Working Group on the Ethical, Legal, and Social Implications of the Human Genome Project from 1995 to 1997.

He has trained a number of philosophers of science, including Peter Godfrey-Smith (University of Sydney), Kyle Stanford (University of California, Irvine), and Michael R. Dietrich (University of Pittsburgh). He also taught C. Kenneth Waters (University of Calgary) and Michael Weisberg (University of Pennsylvania) as undergraduates.

Kitcher is married to Patricia Kitcher, a Kant scholar, philosopher of mind, and the Mark Van Doren Professor of Humanities at Columbia. Their son, Charles Kitcher, is the associate general counsel for the Federal Election Commission.

== Philosophical work ==
Within philosophy, Kitcher is best known for his work in philosophy of biology, science, and mathematics, and outside academia for his work examining creationism and sociobiology. His works attempt to connect the questions raised in philosophy of biology and philosophy of mathematics with the central philosophical issues of epistemology, metaphysics, and ethics. He has also published papers on John Stuart Mill, Kant and other figures in the history of philosophy. His 2012 book documented his developing interest in John Dewey and a pragmatic approach to philosophical issues. He sees pragmatism as providing a unifying and reconstructive approach to traditional philosophy issues. He had, a year earlier, published a book outlining a naturalistic approach to ethics, The Ethical Project (Harvard University Press, 2011). He has also done work on the philosophy of climate change.

=== Criteria for what constitutes "good science" ===
Kitcher's three criteria for good science are:

1. Independent testability of auxiliary hypotheses

"An auxiliary hypothesis ought to be testable independently of the particular problem it is introduced to solve, independently of the theory it is designed to save" (e.g. the evidence for the existence of Neptune is independent of the anomalies in Uranus's orbit).

2. Unification

"A science should be unified .... Good theories consist of just one problem-solving strategy, or a small family of problem-solving strategies, that can be applied to a wide range of problems".

3. Fecundity

"A great scientific theory, like Newton's, opens up new areas of research... Because a theory presents a new way of looking at the world, it can lead us to ask new questions, and so to embark on new and fruitful lines of inquiry... Typically, a flourishing science is incomplete. At any time, it raises more questions than it can currently answer. But incompleteness is no vice. On the contrary, incompleteness is the mother of fecundity... A good theory should be productive; it should raise new questions and presume that those questions can be answered without giving up its problem-solving strategies".

He increasingly recognised the role of values in practical decisions about scientific research.

=== Kuhn and creationism ===
Kitcher is the author of Abusing Science: The Case Against Creationism. He has commented on the way creationists have misinterpreted Kuhn:

Thomas Kuhn's book The Structure of Scientific Revolutions has probably been more widely read—and more widely misinterpreted—than any other book in the recent philosophy of science. The broad circulation of his views has generated a popular caricature of Kuhn's position. According to this popular caricature, scientists working in a field belong to a club. All club members are required to agree on main points of doctrine. Indeed, the price of admission is several years of graduate education, during which the chief dogmas are inculcated. The views of outsiders are ignored. Now I want to emphasize that this is a hopeless caricature, both of the practice of scientists and of Kuhn's analysis of the practice. Nevertheless, the caricature has become commonly accepted as a faithful representation, thereby lending support to the Creationists' claims that their views are arrogantly disregarded.

== Books ==
- Abusing Science: The Case Against Creationism. MIT Press, 1982 (paperback 1983). ISBN 0-262-61037-X
- The Nature of Mathematical Knowledge. Oxford University Press, 1983 (paperback 1984).
- Vaulting Ambition: Sociobiology and the Quest for Human Nature. MIT Press, 1985 (paperback 1987).
- The Advancement of Science, Oxford University Press, April 1993 (paper January 1995).
- The Lives to Come: The Genetic Revolution and Human Possibilities (Simon and Schuster [US], Penguin [UK], January 1996, paperback editions 1997). The American paperback contains a postscript on cloning, almost identical with his article "Whose Self is it, Anyway?".
- Patterns of Scientific Controversies, essay in Scientific Controversies: Philosophical and Historical Perspectives, Oxford University Press, 2000. ISBN 0-195-11987-8
- Science, Truth, and Democracy, Oxford University Press, 2001; paperback 2003. ISBN 0-19-516552-7
- In Mendel's Mirror: Philosophical Reflections on Biology, Oxford University Press, 2003. (This is a collection of seventeen of his articles).
- Finding an Ending: Reflections on Wagner's Ring, co-authored with Richard Schacht, Oxford University Press, February 2004. ISBN 0-19-517359-7
- Living with Darwin: Evolution, Design, and the Future of Faith, Oxford University Press, January 2007. ISBN 0-19-531444-1
- Joyce's Kaleidoscope: An Invitation to Finnegans Wake, Oxford University Press, July 2007. ISBN 0-19-532103-0
- The Ethical Project, Harvard University Press, October 2011. ISBN 0-67-406144-6
- Science in a Democratic Society, Prometheus Books, September 2011. ISBN 1-61-614407-6
- Preludes to Pragmatism: Toward a Reconstruction of Philosophy, Oxford University Press, 2012. ISBN 9780199899555
- Deaths in Venice: The Cases of Gustav von Aschenbach, Columbia University Press, November 2013. ISBN 978-0231162647
- Life After Faith: The Case for Secular Humanism, Yale University Press, 2014. ISBN 978-0197549155
- The Seasons Alter: How to Save Our Planet in Six Acts, co-authored with Evelyn Fox Keller, Norton, 2017. ISBN 978-1-63149-412-3
- Moral Progress, Oxford University Press, 2021. ISBN 9780300203431
- The Main Enterprise of the World: Rethinking Education, Oxford University Press, 2022.
- What's the Use of Philosophy?, Oxford University Press, 2023 ISBN 978-0197657249
