= BioSocieties =

Academic journal

- Discipline: Social science, biology
- Language: English
- Edited by: Hannah Landecker, Catherine Waldby, Ayo Wahlberg

Publication details
- History: 2006-present
- Publisher: Palgrave Macmillan
- Frequency: Quarterly
- Impact factor: 1.8 (2024)

Standard abbreviations
- ISO 4: BioSocieties

Indexing
- ISSN: 1745-8552 (print); 1745-8560 (web)
- LCCN: 2006236997
- OCLC no.: 76751591

Links
- Journal homepage; Online archive

BioSocieties is a quarterly peer-reviewed scientific journal covering the scholarly exploration of the crucial social, ethical and policy implications of developments in the life sciences and biomedicine. It was established in 2006 and was originally published by Cambridge University Press on behalf of the London School of Economics and Political Science (LSE). One of its prominent founding editors was sociologist Nikolas Rose, then at the LSE. In 2010, the journal was acquired by Palgrave Macmillan, which has published it ever since. The senior editors are Hannah Landecker (University of California, Los Angeles), Catherine Waldby (Australian National University), and Ayo Wahblerg (University of Copenhagen). According to the Journal Citation Reports, the journal had a 2016 impact factor of 2.162; according to its current distributor Springer Nature, the journal had a 2024 impact factor of 1.8.
