= Werner Callebaut =

Belgian philosopher (1952–2014)

- Born: Werner Callebaut; October 7, 1952; Mechelen, Belgium
- Died: November 6, 2014 (aged 62); Vienna, Austria
- Education: Ghent University
- Known for: Philosophy of Science
- Scientific career
- Fields: Philosophy of Science
- Workplaces: University of Hasselt; Konrad Lorenz Institute for Evolution and Cognition Research

Werner Callebaut (October 7, 1952 – November 6, 2014) was a professor at the University of Hasselt, scientific director of the Konrad Lorenz Institute for Evolution and Cognition Research, editor and chief of Biological Theory, and president of The International Society for the History, Philosophy, and Social Studies of Biology.

== Biography ==
He attended high school at Koninklijk Atheneum Vilvoorde, Belgium. During his undergraduate studies at the University of Ghent, he was highly influenced by Leo Apostel and Etienne Vermeersch. In 1983, he received a Ph.D. in philosophy from the University of Ghent with a dissertation entitled Contribution to a General Theory of Rationality on Evolutionary Foundations—With an Application to the Organization of Scientific Knowledge. In 1995 he became a professor of philosophy at University of Hasselt. Between 1995 and 1999, he was a visiting fellow at Konrad Lorenz Institute for Evolution and Cognition Research (KLI) and, in 1999, he moved to Vienna, Austria to become scientific manager of KLI. In 2006, he became editor and chief of Biological Theory. In 2013, he was elected president of The International Society for the History, Philosophy, and Social Studies of Biology (ISHPSSB). He unexpectedly died in his sleep.

== Taking the Naturalistic Turn ==
In his 1993 book Taking the naturalistic turn, or how real philosophy of science is done, Callebaut interviewed a number of philosophers of on key topics in the philosophy of science. He then wove together the interviews into conversations on these key topics in the philosophy of science.
