= Michael Weisberg =

American philosopher (born 1976)

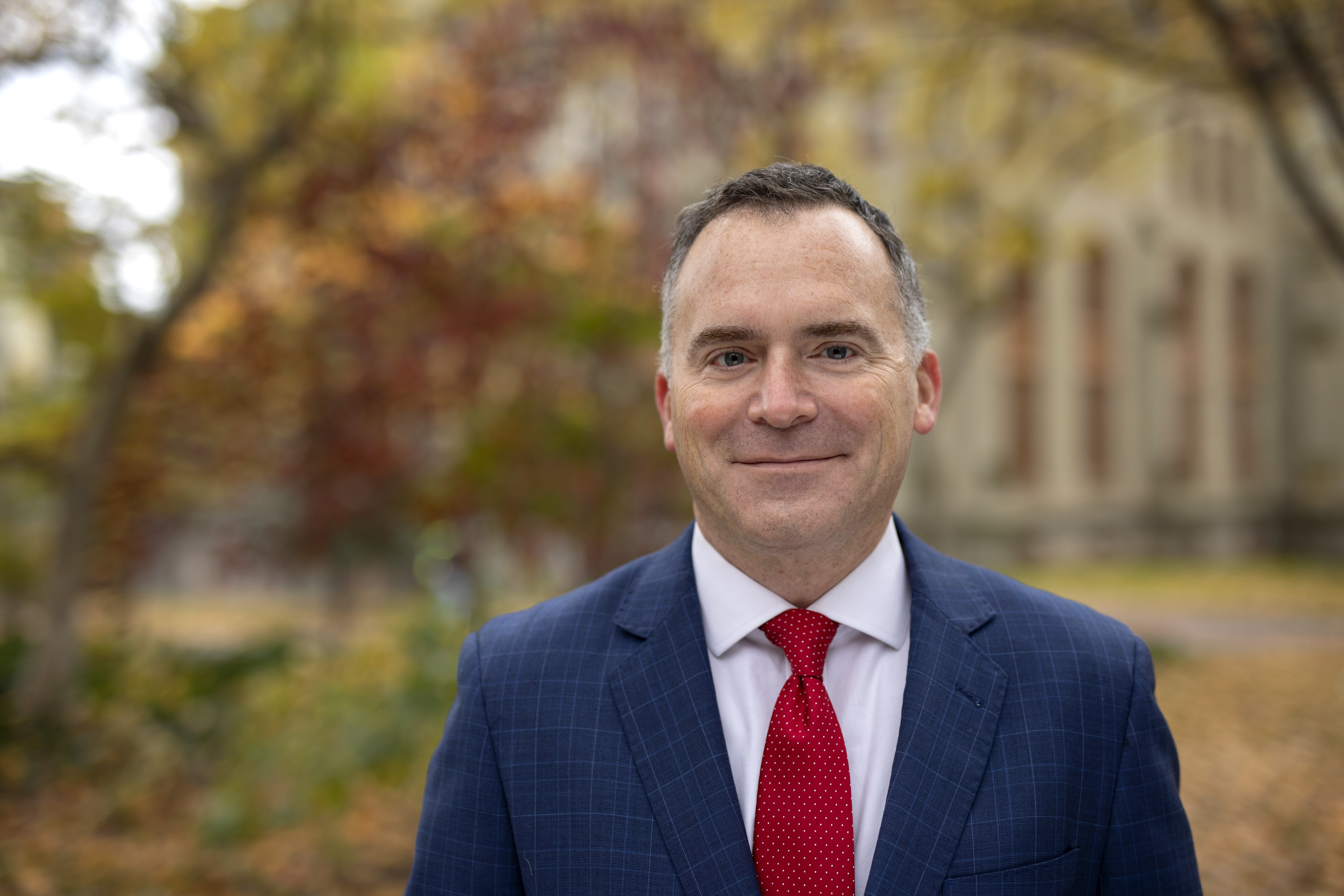
- Born: October 20, 1976 (age 49)

Education
- Education: University of California, San Diego; Stanford University
- Thesis: When less is more: Tradeoffs and idealization in model-building (2003)
- Doctoral advisor: Peter Godfrey-Smith

Philosophical work
- Institutions: University of Pennsylvania
- Main interests: Philosophy of science
- Notable works: Simulation and Similarity: Using Models to Understand the World (2013)

Michael Craig Weisberg (born October 20, 1976) is an American philosopher of science, currently Bess W. Heyman President's Distinguished Professor of Philosophy at the University of Pennsylvania, where he also serves as Deputy Director of Perry World House, directs the Global (formerly Galápagos) Education and Research Alliance, and is a Non-resident Senior Advisor for the International Peace Institute. Professor Weisberg is a Life Member of the Council on Foreign Relations.

== Education and career ==
Weisberg earned both a B.S. in chemistry and a B.A. in philosophy in 1999 from the University of California, San Diego, where he studied with Philip Kitcher. He earned his Ph.D. in philosophy in 2003 at Stanford University under the supervision of Peter Godfrey-Smith. He has taught at the University of Pennsylvania since 2003.

Weisberg was the editor-in-chief of the peer-reviewed journal Biology and Philosophy.

== Philosophical work ==
Weisberg is known for his research in philosophy of science, especially the relationship between idealization and the use of models in biology and chemistry, as well as his work in social ecology and global climate policy. He has also studied public understanding of science.
