= Nikolas Rose =

British sociologist (born 1947)

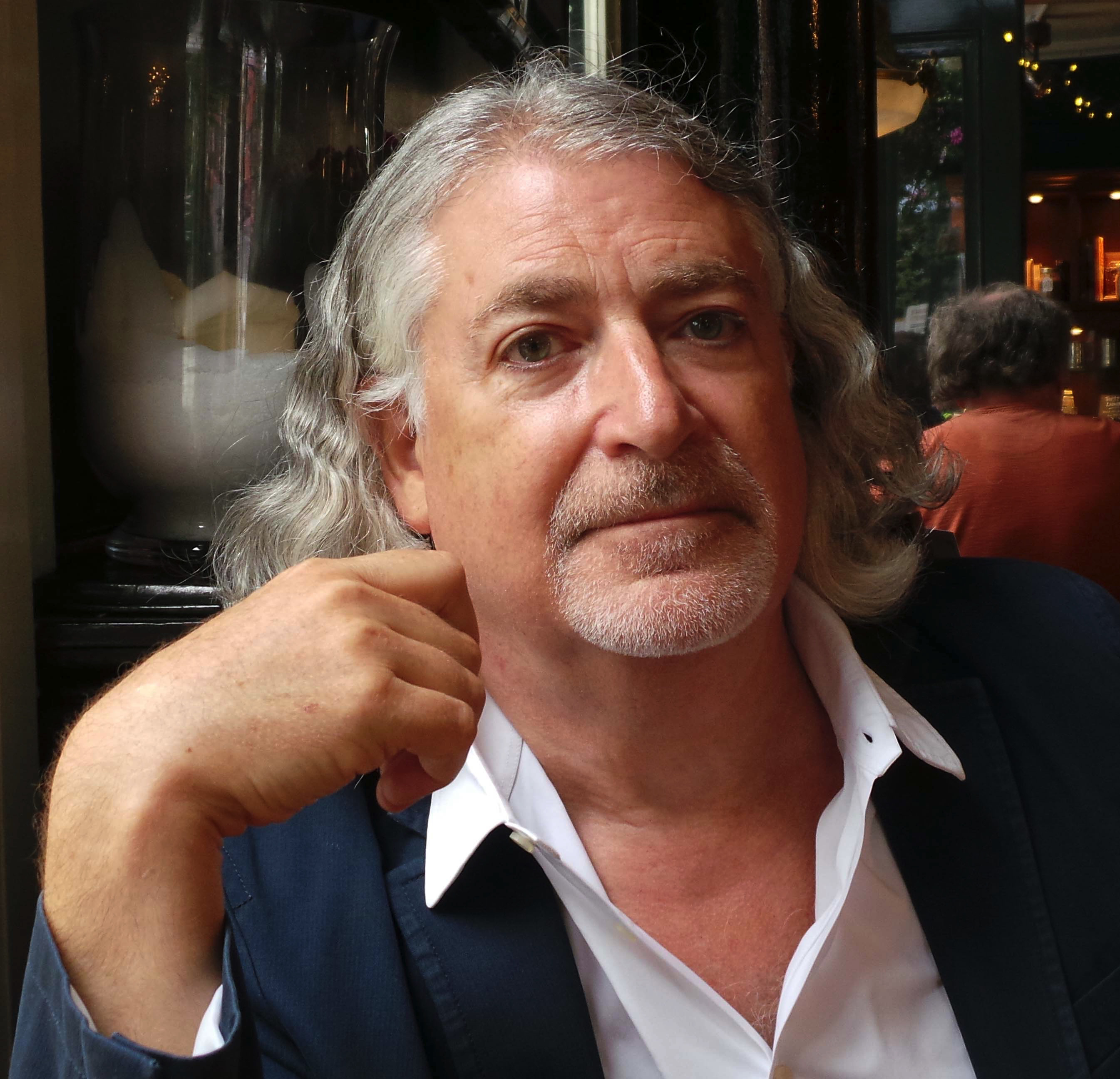
- Photograph by Thomas Osborne
- Born: Nikolas Simon Rose; 13 April 1947 (age 79); London, United Kingdom
- Scientific career
- Fields: Sociologist
- Workplaces: Goldsmiths, University of London; London School of Economics; King's College London (2012–2021); University College London (2021–); Australian National University (2021–)

Nikolas Simon Rose (born 13 April 1947) is a British sociologist and social theorist. He is Distinguished Honorary Professor at the Research School of Social Sciences in the College of Arts and Social Sciences at the Australian National University and Honorary Professor at the Institute of Advanced Studies at University College London. From January 2012 to until his retirement in April 2021 he was Professor of Sociology in the Department of Global Health and Social Medicine (previously Social Science, Health & Medicine) at King's College London, having joined King's to found this new department. He was the co-founder and co-director of King's ESRC Centre for Society and Mental Health.

Before moving to King's College London, he was the James Martin White Professor of Sociology at the London School of Economics, director and founder of LSE's BIOS Centre for the Study of Bioscience, Biomedicine, Biotechnology and Society from 2002 to 2011, and Head of the LSE Department of Sociology (2002–2006). He was previously Professor of Sociology at Goldsmiths, University of London, where he was Head of the Department of Sociology, Pro-Warden for Research and Head of the Goldsmiths Centre for Urban and Community Research and Director of a major evaluation of urban regeneration in South East London. He is a Fellow of the British Academy, of the Royal Society of Arts and the Academy of Social Sciences, and of the Royal Danish Academy of Science and Letters.

== Early life and education ==
Nikolas Simon Rose was born 13 April 1947 in London, England. He was the younger brother of neuroscientist and author Steven Rose (born 1938). He studied biology and psychology at the University of Sussex in the 1960s. He initially worked on Drosophila fruit fly genetics in the lab of John Maynard Smith but, in part due to inspiration from contemporary student protest movements, he changed his studies to animal behavior and then to psychology. As an undergrad Rose had his first exposure to French philosopher Michel Foucault, later a decisive influence on his work, via Foucault's book Madness and Civilization.

After his undergraduate degree, he trained as a teacher and started to work with "maladjusted children" and began to research the history of the psychological and administrative category of maladjustment. After teaching in a school for maladjusted children, he left to return to university to undertake an MSc. He earned a master's degree with his research on maladjustment and then undertook extensive empirical research on formation of the discipline of psychology for his doctorate, and later published a revision of his doctoral thesis as The Psychological Complex (1985). He next worked for three years in the research department of the British National Society for the Prevention of Cruelty to Children.

== Career ==
=== Overview ===
Rose has done extensive research on the history and sociology of psychiatry, on mental health policy and risk, and on the social implications of recent developments in psychopharmacology. He has also published widely on the genealogy of subjectivity, on the history of empirical thought in sociology, and on changing rationalities of political power. He is particularly known for his development of the work of the French historian and philosopher Michel Foucault for the analysis of the politics of our present, and stimulating the revival of studies of governmentality in the Anglo-American world. His own approach to these issues was set out in his 1999 book Powers of Freedom: Reframing Political Thought.

His first book, The Psychological Complex, published in 1985, pioneered a new way of understanding the social history and implications of the discipline of psychology. This was followed in 1996 by Inventing Our Selves: Psychology, Power and Personhood and in 1989 by Governing the Soul: The Shaping of the Private Self. These three books are widely recognised as founding texts in a new way of understanding and analysing the links between expertise, subjectivity and political power. Rose argues that the proliferation of the 'psy' disciplines has been intrinsically linked with transformations in governmentality, in the rationalities and technologies of political power in 'advanced and liberal democracies'. (See also the page governmentality for a description of Rose's development of Foucault's concepts).

Throughout his academic career he has been a critical analyst of psychiatry. His first book on this topic, The Power of Psychiatry, a collection edited together with Peter Miller was published in 1986. His most recent book Our Psychiatric Future: The Politics of Mental Health was published by Polity Press in October 2018. His recent work has been on the social shaping of mental distress and its biopolitical implications. His book The Urban Brain: Mental Health in the Vital City, written with Des Fitzgerald, was published by Princeton University Press in 2022. Questioning Humanity, Being Human in a Posthuman Age, written with Thomas Osborne, was published in 2024.

In November 2001, he was listed by The Guardian newspaper as one of the top five UK based social scientists on the basis of a twenty-year analysis of citations to research papers, and among them, the most cited UK based sociologist. He remains among the most highly cited British sociologists, and his work has been translated into many languages including Swedish, Danish, Finnish, German, Italian, French, Hungarian, Korean, Russian, Chinese, Japanese, Romanian, Portuguese and Spanish.

=== Academic positions ===
Rose was Professor of Sociology at Goldsmiths, University of London, where he was Head of the Department of Sociology, Pro-Warden for Research and Head of the Goldsmiths Centre for Urban and Community Research and Director of a major evaluation of urban regeneration in South East London. At Goldsmith's, he began to convene the BIOS research network, for instance beginning a series of “Vital Politics” conferences.

After Goldsmiths, he became the James Martin White Professor of Sociology at the London School of Economics (LSE), director and founder of LSE's BIOS Centre for the Study of Bioscience, Biomedicine, Biotechnology and Society from 2003 to 2011, and Head of the LSE Department of Sociology (2002–2006).

From January 2012 to until his retirement in April 2021 he was Professor of Sociology in the Department of Global Health and Social Medicine (previously Social Science, Health & Medicine) at King's College London, having joined King's to found this new department. He was the co-founder and co-director of King's ESRC Centre for Society and Mental Health.

Since his retirement, he has been Distinguished Honorary Professor at the Research School of Social Sciences in the College of Arts and Social Sciences at the Australian National University and Honorary Professor at the Institute of Advanced Studies at University College London.

=== Journal editing ===
In 1975, Rose and others founded the journal Ideology and Consciousness to pursue a psychoanalytic and Althusserian structuralist Marxist political project in contrast to the Gramscian Marxism of the Birmingham School of cultural studies. By the late 70s, Rose and the group changed their focus to Michel Foucault's post-structuralism, dropping their focus on ideology and renaming the journal I and C. He was also founding editor of the radical journal Politics and Power, a collaboration with Paul Hirst intended to bring together Marxists and feminist post-Marxists. In 1989, he founded the History of the Present Research Network, an international network of researchers whose work was influenced by the writings of Michel Foucault. Together with Paul Rabinow, he edited the Fourth Volume of Michel Foucault's Essential Works.

From 1996 to 2004 he was managing editor of the journal Economy & Society, one of the UK's leading interdisciplinary journals of social science. In 2006 he became a founding editor of the journal BioSocieties, founded out of the LSE's BIOS Centre, a position he continued to hold until 2025.

=== Project leadership ===
In 2007 he was awarded an ESRC Professorial Research Fellowship – a three-year project entitled 'Brain, Self and Society in the 21st Century'. In 2013, writing with Joelle Abi-Rached, he published Neuro: the new brain sciences and the management of the mind. He has long advocated for 'revitalizing' the social and human sciences through a 'critical friendship' with the life sciences, setting out the nature and implications of his 'cartography of the present' in a number of widely cited papers and in The Politics of Life Itself, published in 2007.

Rose has led international collaborative research projects, including BIONET, a major collaboration of European and Chinese researchers on the ethical governance of biomedical research in China. He is the Chair of the European Neuroscience and Society Network, an international network to encourage critical collaboration between social scientists and neuroscientists, which was funded for several years by the European Science Foundation.

He was previously a member of the Nuffield Council on Bioethics where he was a member of the council's Working Party on Medical profiling and online medicine: the ethics of 'personalised healthcare' in a consumer age (2008–2010) and on Novel Neurotechnologies: intervening in the human brain. He also served for several years as a member of the Royal Society's Science Policy Committee.

He was co-director of the first publicly funded UK centre dedicated to synthetic biology based at Imperial College, where he led a team examining the social, ethical, legal and political dimensions of this emerging field. At King's he led a team of researchers exploring the social implications of new developments in biotechnology, and committed to the democratisation of scientific research and technological development, with a particular focus on synthetic biology and neurobiology. For many years he was a member of the Social and Ethical Division of the Human Brain Project, where he led the Foresight Lab based at King's College London which aimed to identify and evaluate the potential impact of the new knowledge and technologies produced by the Human Brain Project in neuroscience, neurology, computing and robotics, and also examined such issues as artificial intelligence and the political, security, intelligence and military uses of novel brain technologies.

=== Honors ===
He is a Fellow of the British Academy, of the Royal Society of Arts and the Academy of Social Sciences, and of the Royal Danish Academy of Science and Letters. He holds honorary doctorates from the University of Sussex, England, and Aarhus University, Denmark.

== Selected publications ==
=== Books ===
- Questioning Humanity: Being human in a posthuman age, with Thomas Osborne (Edward Elgar, 2024)
- The Urban Brain: Mental Health in the Vital City, with Des Fitzgerald (Princeton University Press, 2022)
- Our Psychiatric Future: the politics of mental health, (Polity, 2018)
- Neuro: The New Brain Sciences and the Management of the Mind, with Joelle M. Abi-Rached (Princeton University Press, 2013)
- Governing the Present: Administering Economic, Social and Personal Life, with Peter Miller (Polity, 2008)
- The Politics of Life Itself: Biomedicine, Power, and Subjectivity in the Twenty-First Century, (PUP, 2007)
- Powers of Freedom: Reframing Political Thought (Cambridge University Press, 1999)
- Inventing Our Selves: Psychology, Power and Personhood (Cambridge University Press, 1996)
- Governing the Soul: The Shaping of the Private Self (Routledge, 1989, Second edition, Free Associations, 1999)
- The Psychological Complex: Psychology, Politics and Society in England, 1869–1939 (Routledge, 1985)

=== Chapters in edited collections (selected) ===
- 'Writing the History of the Present', in Jonathan Joseph, ed., Social Theory: A Reader. Edinburgh: Edinburgh University Press, 2005 (with Andrew Barry and Thomas Osborne) (Reprint of selections from Introduction to Foucault and Political Reason, 1996.)
- 'Biological Citizenship', in Aihwa Ong and Stephen Collier, eds., Global Assemblages: Technology, Politics and Ethics as Anthropological Problems, pp. 439–463. Oxford: Blackwell, 2005 (with Carlos Novas)
- Introduction to The Essential Foucault: Selections from Essential Works of Foucault, 1954–1984, New York: New Press, 2004 (with Paul Rabinow)
- 'Becoming Neurochemical Selves', in Nico Stehr, ed., Biotechnology, Commerce and Civil Society, Transaction Press, 2004
- 'The neurochemical self and its anomalies', in R. Ericson, ed., Risk and Morality, pp. 407–437. University of Toronto Press, 2003.
- 'Power and psychological techniques', in Y. Bates and R. House, eds., Ethically Challenged Professions, pp. 27–46. Ross-on-Wye: PCCS Books, 2003.
- 'Society, madness, and control', in A. Buchanan, ed., The Care of the Mentally Disordered Offender in the Community, pp. 3–25, Oxford: Oxford University Press (2001)
- 'At Risk of Madness', in T. Baker and J. Simon, eds., Embracing Risk: The Changing Culture of Insurance and Responsibility, pp. 209–237, Chicago: University of Chicago Press (2001)

=== Papers in refereed journals (selected) ===
- 'Towards neuroecosociality: mental health in adversity', Theory, Culture and Society, 2021: Towards Neuroecosociality: Mental Health in Adversity
- 'Revitalizing sociology: urban life and mental illness between history and the present', British Journal of Sociology, 67, 1, 138-160 (With Des Fitzgerald and Ilina Singh)
- 'Still like 'birds on the wire'', Economy and Society, 2017, 46, 3–4, 303–323
- Reading the Human Brain How the Mind Became Legible', Body and Society, 2016, 22, 2, 140-177: doi:10.1177/1357034X15623363
- 'Spatial Phenomenotechnics: Making space with Charles Booth and Patrick Geddes', Environment and Planning D: Society and Space, 2004, 22: 209–228 (with Thomas Osborne).
- 'Neurochemical selves', Society, November/December 2003, 41, 1, 46–59.
- 'Kontroll', Fronesis, 2003, Nr. 14–15, 82–101.
- 'The politics of life itself', Theory, Culture and Society (2001), 18(6): 1–30.
- 'Genetic risk and the birth of the somatic individual', Economy and Society, Special Issue on configurations of risk (2000), 29 (4): 484–513. (with Carlos Novas).
- 'The biology of culpability: pathological identities in a biological culture', Theoretical Criminology (2000), 4, 1, 5–34.
