= Biological Theory (journal) =

Peer-reviewed scientific journal

- Discipline: Cognition, evolution
- Language: English
- Edited by: Stuart A. Newman

Publication details
- History: 2005–present
- Publisher: Springer Science+Business Media
- Frequency: Quarterly

Standard abbreviations
- ISO 4: Biol. Theory

Indexing
- ISSN: 1555-5542 (print); 1555-5550 (web)
- OCLC no.: 603260377

Links
- Journal homepage; Online access

Biological Theory is a peer-reviewed scientific journal covering the fields of cognition and evolution, including cognitive psychology, developmental biology, epistemology, evolutionary biology, philosophy of biology, and philosophy of science. It was established in 2005 and originally published by MIT Press, sponsored by the Konrad Lorenz Institute for Evolution and Cognition Research (KLI). As of January 1, 2012, the publisher is Springer Science+Business Media. The first editor-in-chief was Werner Callebaut of the KLI and the University of Vienna). The current editor-in-chief is Kevin Lala.

== Abstracting and indexing ==
The journal is abstracted and indexed in BIOSIS Previews, Biological Abstracts, and The Zoological Record.
