= Marjorie Grene =

American philosopher (1910–2009)

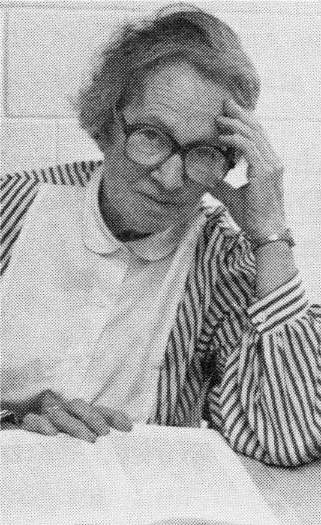
- Born: Marjorie Lena Glicksman; December 13, 1910; Milwaukee, Wisconsin, U.S.
- Died: March 16, 2009 (aged 98); Blacksburg, Virginia, U.S.

Education
- Education: Wellesley College (B.A., 1931); Radcliffe College (M.A., 1934; Ph.D., 1935)
- Academic advisors: C. I. Lewis; David Prall; Alfred North Whitehead

Philosophical work
- Era: Contemporary philosophy
- Region: Western philosophy
- Institutions: University of Chicago; University of California, Davis; Virginia Tech
- Main interests: History of philosophy Epistemology; Philosophy of biology
- Notable ideas: Anti-reductionism in the philosophy of biology

Marjorie Glicksman Grene (December 13, 1910 – March 16, 2009) was an American philosopher. She wrote on existentialism and the philosophy of science, especially the philosophy of biology. She taught at the University of California, Davis from 1965 to 1978. From 1988 until her death, she was Honorary University Distinguished Professor of Philosophy at Virginia Tech.

== Life and career ==
Grene obtained her first degree, in zoology, from Wellesley College in 1931. She then obtained (from 1933–1935) an M.A. and then a doctorate in philosophy from Radcliffe College. This was, she said, "as close as females in those days got to Harvard".

Grene studied with Martin Heidegger and Karl Jaspers, leaving Germany in 1933. She was in Denmark in 1935, and then at the University of Chicago. After losing her position there during World War II, (Note: In her autobiographical book A Philosophical Testament, Marjorie Grene wrote of her 1944 departure from the University of Chicago: "McKeon had me fired.") she spent 15 years as a mother and farmer. She was elected a Fellow of the American Academy of Arts and Sciences in 1976.

Her New York Times obituary said Grene was "one of the first philosophers to raise questions about the synthetic theory of evolution, which combines Darwin's theory of evolution, Mendel's understanding of genetic inheritance and more recent discoveries by molecular biologists". Along with David Depew, she wrote the first history of the philosophy of biology. In 2002, she was the first female philosopher to have a volume of the Library of Living Philosophers devoted to her.

In 1995, the International Society for the History, Philosophy, and Social Studies of Biology established a prize for young scholars in Grene's name, writing: "Not only does her work in the history and philosophy of biology exemplify the strong spirit of interdisciplinary work fundamental to the ISHPSSB, but she played a central role in bringing together diverse scholars of biology even before the formation of the Society."

== Family ==
From 1938 to 1961, Grene was married to David Grene, a classicist who farmed in Illinois and in his native Ireland. They had two children, Ruth Grene, a professor of plant physiology at Virginia Tech, and Nicholas Grene, a professor of English literature at Trinity College, Dublin.

== Works ==
Books authored

- Dreadful Freedom: A Critique of Existentialism (1948) Reissued as Introduction to Existentialism (1959)
- Martin Heidegger (1957)
- A Portrait of Aristotle (1963)
- The Knower and the Known (1966)
- Approaches to a Philosophical Biology (1968)
- Sartre (1973)
- The Understanding of Nature: Essays In The Philosophy Of Biology (1974)
- Philosophy In and Out of Europe (1976) essays
- Descartes (1985)
- Descartes Among the Scholastics (1991) Aquinas Lecture 1991
- Interactions. The Biological Context of Social Systems (1992) with Niles Eldredge
- A Philosophical Testament (1995)
- Philosophy of Biology: An Episodic History (2004) with David Depew

Works edited and translated

- Philosophers Speak for Themselves: From Descartes To Kant. Readings in the Philosophy of the Renaissance and Enlightenment (1940) with Thomas Vernor Smith
  - Reissued in two volumes: Descartes to Locke (1958) and Berkeley, Hume, Kant (1963)
- The World View of Physics by C. F. von Weizsäcker (1952) translator
- The Anatomy of Knowledge: Papers Presented to the Study Group on Foundations of Cultural Unity, Bowdoin College, 1965 and 1966; (1969) editor
- Knowing & Being: essays by Michael Polanyi, (1969) editor
- Toward a Unity of Knowledge (1969) editor
- Laughing and Crying: A Study of the Limits of Human Behavior by Helmuth Plessner (1970) translator with James Spencer Churchill
- Interpretations of Life and Mind: Essays Around the Problem of Reduction (1971) editor
- Spinoza : A Collection of Critical Essays (1973) editor
- Topics in the Philosophy of Biology (1976) editor with Everett Mendelsohn
- Dimensions Of Darwinism : Themes And Counterthemes In Twentieth-Century Evolutionary Theory (1983) editor
- Spinoza And The Sciences (1986) editor
- Muntu : African Culture and the Western World by Janheinz Jahn (1990) translator
- Descartes and His Contemporaries: Meditations, Objections, and Replies (1995) editor with Roger Ariew
- The Mechanization of the Heart: Harvey and Descartes by Thomas Fuchs (2001) translator
- Malebranche's First and Last Critics: Simon Foucher and Dortous De Mairan (2002) with Richard A. Watson; translator
- Apology for Raymond Sebond by Montaigne (2003) translator with Roger Ariew
- Geoffroy Saint Hilaire by Hervé Le Guyader (2004) translator

*For more complete details see "The Publications of Marjorie Grene" in her 1986 festschrift Human Nature and Natural Knowledge or Grene's C.V.

== See also ==
- American philosophy
