= Physics envy =

English expression

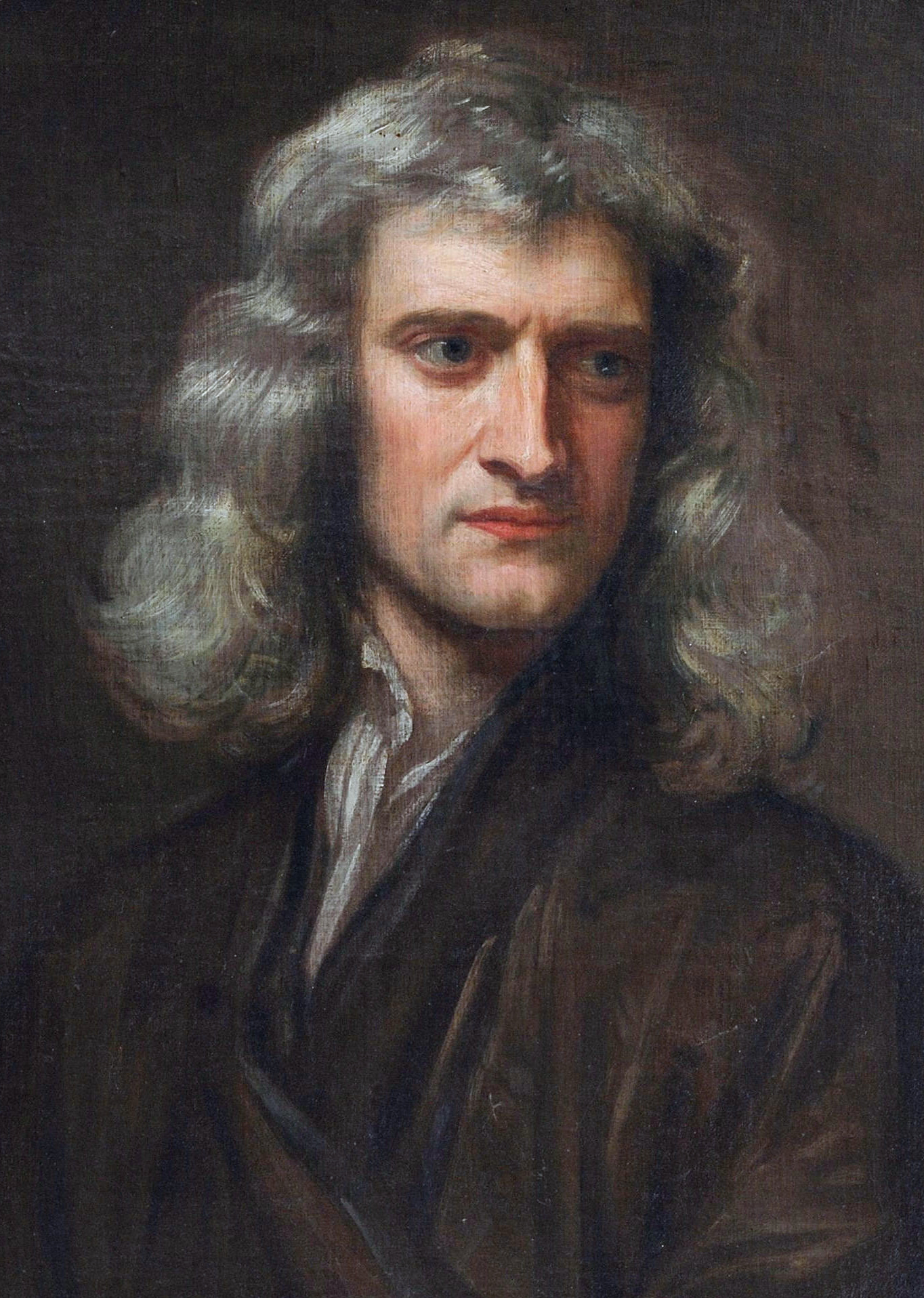
Isaac Newton whose Principia Mathematica established physics as a model of mathematical precision that other disciplines have sought to emulate

The term physics envy is used to criticize the modern writing and research of academics working in the "softer sciences", such as economics, sociology, psychology, political science, or anthropology. The term argues that writing and working practices in these disciplines have overused confusing jargon and complicated mathematics to seem more rigorous, predictable or quantifiable as in heavily mathematics-based natural science subjects like physics.

== Background ==
The success of physics in "mathematicising" itself, particularly since Isaac Newton's Principia Mathematica, is generally considered remarkable and often disproportionate compared to other areas of inquiry. "Physics envy" refers to the envy that arises from the perceived inadequacies of scholars in other disciplines for the mathematical precision of fundamental concepts obtained by physicists.

More specifically, the term is usually in reference to the social sciences, since these academic areas have the reputation of expressing their concepts with an artificial complexity similar to mathematics and math-based fields as a form of obscurantism. This reputation is at least partially due to scholarly hoaxes like the infamous Sokal affair, which brought the intellectual rigor of prominent social science journals into question.

Although the term was coined later, the concept of physics-envy was discussed by economists in the middle of the 20th century when discussing method in the social sciences. The Austrian economist Ludwig von Mises has quipped in his economic treatise on Human Action on the limitations of economics. He has also elaborated in his essay on method:

The philosophers considered physics as the paragon of science and blithely assumed that all knowledge is to be fashioned on its model. They dispensed with biology, satisfying themselves that one day later generations would succeed in reducing the phenomena of life to the operation of elements that can be fully described by physics. They slighted history as "mere literature" and ignored the existence of economics. Positivism, as foreshadowed by Laplace, baptized by Auguste Comte, and resuscitated and systematized by contemporary logical or empirical positivism, is essentially panphysicalism, a scheme to deny that there is any other method of scientific thinking than that starting from the physicist's recording of "protocol sentences."

His predecessor in the Austrian school of economics, Friedrich von Hayek discussed this issue as well in both the Use of Knowledge in Society, and in his Nobel lecture the pretense of knowledge:

It seems to me that this failure of the economists to guide policy more successfully is closely connected with their propensity to imitate as closely as possible the procedures of the brilliantly successful physical sciences – an attempt which in our field may lead to outright error. It is an approach which has come to be described as the “scientistic” attitude – an attitude which, as I defined it some thirty years ago, “is decidedly unscientific in the true sense of the word, since it involves a mechanical and uncritical application of habits of thought to fields different from those in which they have been formed.”1 I want today to begin by explaining how some of the gravest errors of recent economic policy are a direct consequence of this scientistic error.

Evolutionary biologist Ernst Mayr discusses the issue of the inability to reduce biology to its mathematical basis in his book What Makes Biology Unique?. Noam Chomsky discusses the ability and desirability of reduction to its mathematical basis in his article "Mysteries of Nature: How Deeply Hidden." Chomsky contributed extensively to the development of the field of theoretical linguistics, a formal science.

== Examples ==
The social sciences have been accused of possessing an inferiority complex, which has been associated with physics envy. For instance, positivist scientists accept a mistaken image of natural science so it can be applied to the social sciences. The phenomenon also exists in business strategy research as demonstrated by historian Alfred Chandler Jr.'s strategy structure model. This framework holds that a firm must evaluate the environment in order to set up its structure that will implement strategies. Chandler also maintained that there is close connection "between mathematics, physics, and engineering graduates and the systemizing of the business strategy paradigm".

Within finance, economics and investing, various schools of thought have been accused of having physics envy. An example is the 1998 collapse of the hedge fund Long Term Capital Management, which used a variety of advanced mathematical formulas for investing and trading. Yet Andrew Lo and Mark T. Mueller write how such mathematical rigor in these fields is often proved flawed or false due to "limitations imposed by uncertainty [and] all the vicissitudes and frailties of human behavior" which are very different from the phenomena studied by physics.

In the field of artificial intelligence (AI), physics envy arises in cases of projects that lack interaction with each other, using only one idea due to the manner by which new hypotheses are tested and discarded in the pursuit of one true intelligence.

== See also ==
- Scientism
- Academese
- Newtonianism
- Philosophy of biology
- Philosophy of physics
- Philosophy of science
- Reductionism
- Unreasonable ineffectiveness of mathematics
