= Michael R. Dietrich =

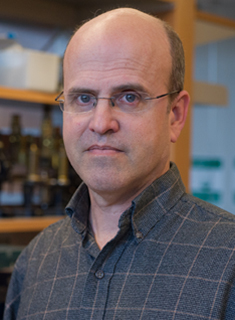
- Born: Michael Robert Dietrich; November 7, 1963 (age 62); Alabama, United States
- Education: University of California, San Diego
- Occupation: Professor
- Known for: History of Biology, Philosophy of Biology

Michael Robert Dietrich (born November 7, 1963, Alabama, United States) is a professor of the history and philosophy of science at the University of Pittsburgh. His research concerns developments in twentieth century genetics, evolutionary biology, and developmental biology, with a special emphasis on scientific controversies.

== Early life ==
Born into a military family, Dietrich spent his early life in a number of different locations in the United States and Germany. He earned his B.A. in Philosophy and Biology with a minor in Chemistry from Virginia Tech in 1985, and his Ph.D. in Philosophy from the University of California, San Diego in 1991, where Philip Kitcher was his advisor.

== Scholarship ==
Although trained in philosophy, Dietrich's scholarship is primarily historical and interdisciplinary with a focus on scientific controversy. He has written extensively about the role of controversy in molecular evolution with the introduction of the neutral theory of molecular evolution and the subsequent neutralist-selectionist controversy. His histories of molecular evolution are complemented by philosophical analysis of the importance of random genetic drift in evolutionary biology, the neutral theory of molecular evolution, and the molecular clock. He has collaborated with Robert Skipper Jr and Roberta Millstein on a number of articles on the history and philosophy of population genetics, evolution, and random genetic drift. Dietrich's interest in controversy extends to controversial scientists as well, most notably the geneticist Richard Goldschmidt, who was branded a scientific heretic for his views on the gene, macroevolution, and hopeful monsters.

Together with Oren Harman, Dietrich has edited a trilogy of books concerning biologists. The first, Rebels, Mavericks, and Heretics in Biology (Yale University Press, 2008) featured essays on iconoclastic biologists. The second, Outsider Scientists: Routes to Innovation in Biology (University of Chicago Press, 2013), examined the conditions that allowed scientists trained outside of biology to make innovations within biology. The third, Dreamers, Revolutionaries, and Visionaries in the Life Sciences was published in 2018.

Dietrich also co-edited The Educated Eye: Visual Culture and Pedagogy in the Life Sciences (University Press of New England, 2012) with Nancy Anderson. In 2021, he published two additional co-edited books: Nature Remade: Engineering Life, Envisioning Worlds (University of Chicago Press, 2021) with Luis Campos, Tiago Saraiva, and Christian Young. and Handbook of the Historiography of Biology (Springer, 2021) with Oren Harman and Mark Borrello.

== Appointments ==
Dietrich is currently a professor at the University of Pittsburgh in the History and Philosophy of Science Department. From 1998 to 2017, he was a Professor in the Department of Biological Sciences at Dartmouth College. Before moving to Dartmouth in 1998, he taught in the History and Philosophy of Science Program at the University of California, Davis.

From 2003 to 2005, Dietrich served as President of the International Society for the History, Philosophy, and Social Studies of Biology (ISHPSSB). He was Editor-in-Chief of the Journal of the History of Biology from 2012 to 2017, and was Editor of the Mendel Newsletter, which was published by the American Philosophical Society until 2025.

Dietrich is a fellow of the American Association for the Advancement of Science. He was elected Chair of Section L of the AAAS in 2017.

== Books ==
- Rebels, Mavericks, and Heretics in Biology, Edited by Oren Harmon and Michael R. Dietrich, Yale University Press, 2008.
- The Educated Eye: Visual Culture and Pedagogy in the Life Sciences, Edited by Nancy Anderson and Michael R. Dietrich, University Press of New England, 2012.
- Outsider Scientists: Routes to Innovation in Biology, Edited by Oren Harmon and Michael R. Dietrich, University of Chicago Press, 2013.
- Dreamers, Visionaries, and Revolutionaries in the Life Sciences, Edited by Oren Harmon and Michael R. Dietrich, University of Chicago Press, 2018.
- Nature Remade: Engineering Life, Envisioning Worlds (University of Chicago Press, 2021) with Luis Campos, Tiago Saraiva, and Christian Young.
- Handbook of the Historiography of Biology (Springer, 2021) with Oren Harman and Mark Borrello.
- Scaffolding: Selected Contributions of James R. Griesemer to History, Philosophy, and Biology (Springer, 2025) with Rachel Ankeny and Sabina Leonelli.
