= Patricia Kitcher =

Philosopher

- Born: 1948 (age 77–78)
- Education: Wellesley College (B.A.); Princeton University (Ph.D.)
- Spouse: Philip Kitcher (m. 1971)
- Scientific career
- Fields: Philosophy of psychology
- Workplaces: Columbia University
- Doctoral advisor: George W. Pitcher

Patricia W. Kitcher (born 1948) is an American philosopher who is the Roberta and William Campbell Professor of Philosophy at Columbia University, widely known for her work on Immanuel Kant and on philosophy of psychology. She has held many positions at different universities, is a founding chair of a committee at the University of California, and has a lead role in multiple professional organizations. Kitcher's most notable interests throughout her career regard cognition and Kantian ethics. She is the author of multiple papers and two books.

== Education and career ==
Born Patricia Williams, she attended Wellesley College and then graduate school in philosophy at Princeton where she studied with George Pitcher. Kitcher has held faculty positions at the University of Vermont, the University of Minnesota, and University of California, San Diego, and a visiting position at University of Michigan. In 1998 she went to Columbia University where she became the Mark van Doren Professor of the Humanities and chair of the philosophy department. She lives in New York City with her husband, Philip Kitcher, also a philosopher at Columbia, with whom she has two sons, Andrew and Charles.

She has served as department chair in three different universities and was the founding chair of the University of California committee on the status of women. She was also president of the Society for Philosophy and Psychology, president of the North American Kant Society, and serves on the editorial board of Journal of Philosophy.

== Philosophical work ==
Kitcher's interest in cognition manifested early and has continued to shape and inform her work throughout her career. Her doctoral dissertation defended a psychological continuity criterion for personal identity but extended the scope of the psychological criterion beyond that traditionally posited to include broader and more abstract cognitive characteristics, such as cognitive approach or cognitive style. Since then her work has ranged widely from traditional philosophy of psychology, to Sigmund Freud, and ultimately to her major interest, the philosophy of Immanuel Kant.

In her early work Kitcher wrote a number of papers in philosophy of psychology, philosophy of mind, and philosophy of science. She argued for the viability of intentional psychology and the autonomy of functionalist psychology from neurophysiology. Later work predominantly concentrated on analysis of problems stemming from the interpretation of Kant's first Critique. Kitcher has written numerous articles on the forms of intuition, Kant's epistemology, self-consciousness, and on how transcendental arguments work.

Kitcher has written two books that also pursue psychological themes. Kant's Transcendental Psychology was a radical departure from most Kant exegesis. The book makes two main claims about the Critique of Pure Reason. First, contra Peter Frederick Strawson, Kitcher argues that to understand synthetic a priori knowledge, it is essential to consider transcendental psychology. Second, she explicates a Kantian argument for the necessity of an integrated thinking subject, which serves as a reply to David Hume's denial of the unity of the self.

Kant's Thinker (2011), was called "an ambitious and challenging work" by Paul Guyer in the European Journal of Philosophy. In this book, she continues work on "a central theme of her earlier work: how to understand Kant's view of the unity of self-consciousness in the Critique of Pure Reason."

In Freud's Dream Kitcher argued that Freud was the first cognitive scientist: Psychoanalysis should be thought of as an exercise in interdisciplinary theory construction, and as such, it illuminates the pitfalls to which such interdisciplinary approaches are subject. (Kitcher jokes that her arguments managed to alienate all readers: Freudians, because she exposes the mistaken foundation of psychoanalysis, and anti-Freudians, because she portrays his program as scientifically legitimate.)

Around the turn of the new century, Kitcher's interests turned toward Kantian ethics. Her works from this period provide an account of Kantian maxims and an interpretation of Kant's argument for the Formulation of the Universal Law for the Categorical Imperative.

== Awards ==
Kitcher has recently been recognized for her work in education and in her academic field. In 2017, she won the Society of Columbia Graduates' Great Teacher Award. The awards is given annually to an outstanding professor for their ability to make effective oral presentations, the ability to relate positively to students outside the classroom, and for their "recognized standing in their respective academic disciplines."

== Selected bibliography ==
- "The Crucial Relation in Personal Identity." Canadian Journal of Philosophy 7 (1) (1978): 131–145.
- "Kant on Self-Identity." Philosophical Review 91 (1) (1982): 41–72.
- "Kant's Paralogisms." Philosophical Review 91 (4) (1982): 515–547.
- "In Defense of Intentional Psychology." Journal of Philosophy 81 (2) (1984): 89–106.
- "Narrow Taxonomy and Wide Functionalism." Philosophy of Science 52 (1) (1985): 78–97.
- "Discovering the Forms of Intuition." Philosophical Review 96 (1987): 205–248.
- Kant's Transcendental Psychology. Oxford University Press. 15 November 1990. ISBN 978-0-19-802259-6.
- Freud's Dream: A Complete Interdisciplinary Science of Mind. MIT Press. 1995. ISBN 978-0-262-61115-2.
- "Revisiting Kant's Epistemology: Skepticism, Apriority, and Psychologism." Noûs 29 (3) (1995): 285–315.
- Patricia Kitcher, ed. (1998). Kant's Critique of Pure Reason: Critical Essays. Rowman & Littlefield. ISBN 978-0-8476-8917-0.
- "Kant on Self-Consciousness." Philosophical Review 108 (1999): 345–386.
- "On Interpreting Kant's Thinker as Wittgenstein's 'I'." Philosophy and Phenomenological Research 61 (2000): 33–63.
- "Kant's Argument for the Categorical Imperative." Noûs 38 (4) (2004) 555–584.
- Kant's Thinker. Oxford University Press. 7 January 2011. ISBN 978-0-19-984248-3.
