= International Society for the History, Philosophy, and Social Studies of Biology =

International academic organization

- Abbreviation: ISHPSSB ("ishkabibble")
- Founded: 1989 (37 years ago)
- Website: www.ishpssb.org

The International Society for the History, Philosophy, and Social Studies of Biology (ISHPSSB) is an international academic organization founded in 1989. The society hosts the largest and most important meeting for the fields of philosophy of biology, history of biology, and the social studies/science studies/sociological studies of biology. The society hosts a biennial meeting, supports off-year workshops, runs a monthly newsletter, and offers various types of academic prizes.

== Pronunciation ==
The acronym of the society —ISHPSSB— is "utterly unpronounceable as written." In 1994, David Hull suggested the pronunciation "ishkabibble" as a homage to comedian Merwyn Bogue.

== History of the society ==
The idea of an ISHPSSB started with Marjorie Grene. Recruiting Richard Burian to co-organize, Grene received funding in 1981 from the Council of Philosophical Studies to run a seminal meeting in 1982 at Cornell University. In the same year, Burian organized an interest group meeting with attendees of a four-society meeting-- History of Science, History of Technology, Philosophy of Science, and Social Studies of Science. The interest group decided to organize an informal summer meeting in 1983. This became the beginning of the odd-numbered two-year conference cycle.

Accounts here differ on where the 1983 meeting was held. In an article on Marjorie Grene's legacy, it was stated that the meeting occurred at Kenyon College. According to the first ISHPSSB newsletter in 1989, however, it was held in 1983 at Denison University. A much larger group gathered in 1985 at St. Mary's College in Indiana and then in 1987 at Virginia Tech. In a footnote of a paper analyzing the history of philosophy of biology, the first 1983 meeting was stated as occurring at Virginia Tech. Regardless, it was decided thereafter that a society should be founded to officially organize regular conferences that can bring together current research on the history, philosophy, and social studies of biology. ISHPSSB was officially named at the University of Western Ontario meeting in 1989 and its bylaws and governance were formalized in 1990. In 1991, ISHPSSB passed its first official resolution: they will never meet in a place that has sodomy laws. This "political" resolution proposed by David Hull was passed with no dissents or questions.

According to Jane Maienschein, the first president of ISHPSSB after the 1989 meeting, there were multiple "presidents" at the beginning of the society. The title of "Honorary Past President" was given to Richard Burian and Marjorie Grene and Ernst Mayr were both Honorary Presidents. The first elected vice president was David Hull, who was then elected president from 1991 to 1993. They were all deeply involved in the founding of the society. Other individuals and events that were formative for the society included William C. Wimsatt and the 1977 Council for Philosophical Studies Summer Institute on "Biological and Social Perspectives on Human Nature" in Colorado.

The history of the society still awaits proper documentation. As noted by Maienschein, "it is amusing that a society that includes History in its title hasn't done such a great job of recording and writing its own history." Records of the society were kept by archivist Pam Henson. Richard Burian has offered to write up a history of the society, but the link is currently inactive.

== Significance of the society ==
ISHPSSB is noted as one of the few prominent interdisciplinary societies that strive to put scientists and philosophers in the same room. The spirit of the conference, as envisioned by founder Marjorie Grene, was that the teaching of philosophy biology necessarily requires "intimate contact with biology, history of biology, and the social, institutional, and technological settings in which biological work was done." This was achieved by establishing intimate contact with professionals in each discipline. The first few meetings of the society were thus informal and involved a changing mix of biologists, historians, philosophers, and social scientists organized around thematic sessions to break through barriers that block collaboration and mutual understanding. As Maienschein recounted, David Hull stated his vision in 1991 that ISHPSSB "is a place where everybody can come and feel included. It is a place for all of us from all those alphabet soup of disciplines or those working between and across disciplines. A place for established scholars migrating from other fields, well-known leaders in their fields, and new graduate students. A place for people to try out new ideas as well a to present more polished works."

The interdisciplinarity scope of the society was the subject of several studies. Celebrated for its informality, inclusivity, and interdisciplinarity, the society has experienced "uncontrollable growth," thus presenting difficult logistic challenges for meeting organizers.

== Meetings ==
The society runs a biennial conference that gathers on odd-numbered years. On even-numbered "off" years, it sponsors several workshops that bear the ISHPSSB name. In 2017, the main conference was hosted in a South American country for the first time in the society's history, at University of São Paulo, Brazil. Information about past meetings up to 1997 can be found on the conference website.

== Prizes ==
The society offers three types of prizes, each recognizing a different type of achievement. The prizes are named after "pivotal and dearly missed" members of the community.

=== The Werner Callebaut Prize ===
The Werner Callebaut Prize, in memory of Werner Callebaut, is offered as an interdisciplinary early career prize to graduate students "working at the intersection of the fields represented by the ISHPSSB." The award is given on the basis of a manuscript that came out of a presentation at one of the last two annual meetings. The paper has to take an interdisciplinary approach and the recipient must be a graduate student at the time of the presentation. The prize was first awarded in 2015.

=== The Marjorie Grene Prize ===
The Marjorie Grene Prize is named after Marjorie Grene. The criteria are the same as that for the Werner Callebaut Prize, minus the interdisciplinarity requirement. The prize was first awarded in 1997.

=== The David L Hull Prize ===
The David L. Hull Prize in memory of David Hull, is awarded to individuals at any stage of their career. The intention is to recognize extraordinary scholarship and to promote awareness of the significant efforts made to combine scholarship with service. The prize was first awarded in 2011.

== Presidents ==
The current president of the society is Sabina Leonelli. An incomplete list of past presidents is as follows:

- 2023—2025 Betty Smocovitis
- 2021—2023 Rachel Ankeny
- 2019—2021 Gregory Radick
- 2017—2019 Marsha Richmond
- 2015—2017 Michel Morange
- 2013—2014 Werner Callebaut
- 2011—2013 Paul E. Griffiths
- 2009—2011 Ana Barahona
- 2007—2009 James R. Griesemer
- 2003—2005 Michael R. Dietrich
- 2001—2003 Lindley Darden
- 1999—2001 Richard Burian
- 1997—1999 Elisabeth Lloyd
- 1995—1997 Peter Taylor
- 1991—1993 David Hull
- 1989—1991 Jane Maienschein
