= Paul Rabinow =

American anthropologist (1944–2021)

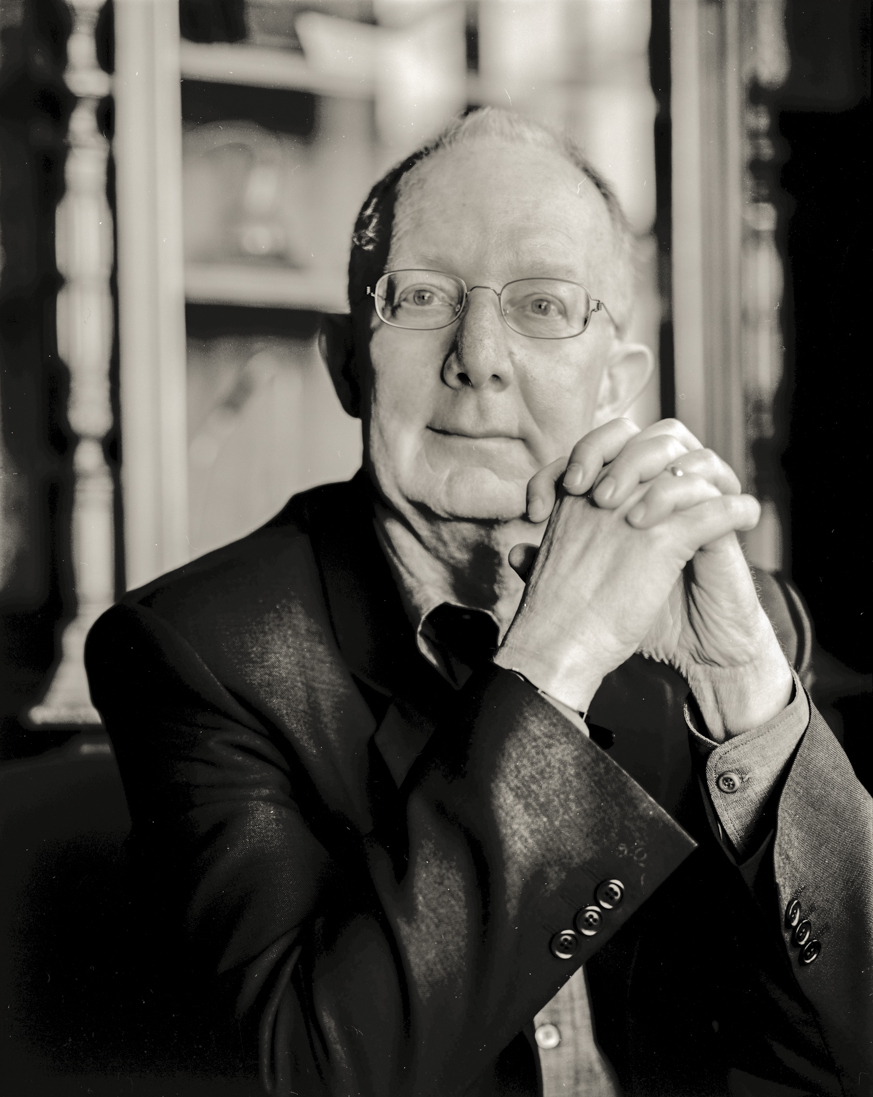
- Portrait of Paul M. Rabinow, made in 2002 by Saâd A. Tazi, at École Normale Supérieure, Paris, during his Blaise Pascal professorship.
- Born: 21 June 1944; Florida, U.S.
- Died: 6 April 2021 (aged 76); Berkeley, California, U.S.
- Citizenship: American
- Education: University of Chicago
- Scientific career
- Fields: Cultural anthropology
- Workplaces: University of California, Berkeley
- Thesis: A history of power in a Moroccan village. (1970)
- Doctoral advisor: Clifford Geertz
- Doctoral students: João Biehl, Lucien Castaing-Taylor

Paul M. Rabinow (June 21, 1944 – April 6, 2021) was a professor of anthropology at the University of California (Berkeley), director of the Anthropology of the Contemporary Research Collaboratory (ARC), and former director of human practices for the Synthetic Biology Engineering Research Center (SynBERC). He worked with, and wrote extensively about, the French philosopher Michel Foucault.

== Biographical details ==
Rabinow was born in Florida but raised in New York City from a young age. His grandparents were all Russian Jewish immigrants. He lived in Sunnyside, Queens. He stated that at the time, the neighborhood was a garden city and a socialist and communist 'zone'. He attended Stuyvesant High School. Rabinow received his B.A. (1965), M.A. (1967), and Ph.D. (1970) in anthropology from the University of Chicago. He studied at the École Pratique des Hautes Études in Paris (1965–66). He received a Guggenheim Fellowship (1980), was a visiting Fulbright Professor at the National Museum in Rio de Janeiro (1987), taught at the École des Hautes Études en Sciences Sociales in Paris (1986) as well as the École Normale Supérieure (1997), and was a visiting Fulbright Professor at the University of Iceland (1999). He held fellowships from the National Endowment for the Humanities and National Science Foundation Professional Development Fellowships (for training in molecular biology). He was co-founder of the Berkeley Program in French Cultural Studies. He was named Chevalier de l’Ordre des Arts et des Lettres by the French Government in 1998. He received the University of Chicago Alumni Association Professional Achievement Award in 2000. He was awarded the visiting Chaire Internationale de Recherche Blaise Pascal at the École Normale Supérieure for 2001–2002. STICERD Distinguished Visiting Professor – BIOS Centre for the Study of Bioscience, Biomedicine, Biotechnology and Society, London School of Economics (2004). Rabinow died on April 6, 2021.

== Overview ==
Rabinow is known for his development of an "anthropology of reason". If anthropology is understood as being composed of anthropos + logos, then anthropology can be taken up as a practice of studying how the mutually productive relations of knowledge, thought, and care are given form within shifting relations of power. More recently, Rabinow developed a distinctive approach to what he called an "anthropology of the contemporary" that moves methodologically beyond modernity as an object of study or as a metric to order all inquiries.

Rabinow is well known for conceptual work drawing on French, German, and American traditions. He was a close interlocutor of Michel Foucault and edited and interpreted Foucault's work as well as ramifying it in new directions.

Rabinow's work consistently confronted the challenge of inventing and practicing new forms of inquiry, writing, and ethics for the human sciences. He argued that, currently, the dominant knowledge production practices, institutions, and venues for understanding human things in the 21st century are inadequate institutionally and epistemologically. In response, he designed modes of experimentation and collaboration consisting of focused concept work and the explorations of new forms of case-based inquiry.

Rabinow also devoted a great deal of energy to the invention of new venues adjacent to the existing university structures, diagnosing the university's disciplinary organization and career patterns as among the major impediments to 21st century thought. Since the organization and practices of the social sciences and humanities in the U.S. university system have changed little in recent decades, they are unlikely to facilitate the composition of contemporary equipment. Rabinow called for the creation of venues that are adjacent to, but more flexible than, the university and the existing disciplinary structure. He played leading roles in the design of two such organizations, the Anthropology of the Contemporary Research Collaboratory (ARC) and the Synthetic Biology Engineering Research Center (SynBERC).

The Anthropology of the Contemporary Research Collaboratory was founded by Paul Rabinow, Stephen Collier, and Andrew Lakoff as part of an effort to create new forms of inquiry in the human sciences. Its aspiration is to create models for new infrastructures, tools of collaboration, and practices of inquiry. The core of the ARC collaboratory is ongoing reflection and communication in a now broadening network of scholars about concept formation and collaboratory work in the human sciences. ARC is a collaboratory for inquiry into contemporary forms of life, labor, and language. ARC engages in empirical study and conceptual work with global reach and long-term perspective. ARC creates contemporary equipment for collaborative work adequate to emergent challenges in the 21st century. ARC's current concerns focus on interconnections among security, ethics, and the sciences.

== Concept work ==
The relation of concepts and cases in Rabinow's work distinguishes itself from the more common mode of social science work predicated on using examples to test general theories or philosophical practice that seeks analytic clarity about universals or general (often highly abstract) cases. In contrast, Rabinow argues that work on concepts opens up and orients inquiry into the concrete features of distinctive cases, whereas the use of ostensibly timeless theory or universal concepts is unlikely to be very helpful in drawing attention to particularities and singularities. Given this goal, such traditional approaches can function as a real impediment to inquiry. Rabinow defines concept work as “constructing, elaborating and testing a conceptual inventory as well as specifying and experimenting with multi-dimensional diagnostic and analytic frames.” In that sense, Rabinow's work continues with appropriate modifications a social scientific tradition stretching from Max Weber through Clifford Geertz.

Rabinow held that concepts are tools designed to be used on specified problems and calibrated to the production of pragmatic outcomes, both analytic and ethical. As such, concepts must be adjusted to the changing topology of problem spaces. Concept work involves archaeological, genealogical, and diagnostic dimensions. Archaeologically, concept work involves investigating and characterizing concepts as part of a prior repertoire or structured conceptual ensemble. Genealogically, concept work frees concepts from their field of emergence by showing the contingent history of their selection, formation, and potential contemporary significance. Diagnostically, concept work involves a critical function: testing the adequacy and appropriateness of a given concept or repertoire of concepts to new problems and purposes.

== Anthropology of the contemporary ==
As a mode of inquiry, Rabinow distinguishes the Anthropology of the Contemporary from Michel Foucault's History of the Present. As Rabinow describes it, the History of the Present consists in formulating an understanding of the past as “a means of showing the contingency of the present and thereby contribute to making a more open future.” The current challenge is to be specific about which inquiries and what objects are best engaged with an approach that is drawn from a History of the Present orientation. Contrastingly, Rabinow defined the contemporary as a (re)assemblage of both old and new elements and their interactions and interfaces. This means, among other things, that contemporary problems and objects are emergent and consequently, by definition, contingent. Emergence refers to “a state in which multiple elements combine to produce an assemblage, whose significance cannot be reduced to prior elements and relations.” It follows that the History of the Present, while often helpful, is not fully adequate to work on the contemporary because by definition the contemporary is contingent.

Rabinow identified “the contemporary” as a temporal and ontological problem space. In Marking Time (2007) he distinguished two senses of the term contemporary. First, to be contemporary is to exist at the same time as something else. This meaning has temporal but no historical connotations. The second sense, however, carries both temporal and historical connotations, and it is this meaning that figures in Rabinow's work. Rabinow took up the contemporary as a “moving ratio.” Just as “the modern” can be thought of as a moving ratio of tradition and modernity, the contemporary “is a moving ratio of modernity, moving through the recent past and near future in a (non-linear) space.”

As such, the Anthropology of the Contemporary consists of analytic work that helps develop modes of inquiry into under-determined, emergent, and discordant relations. It seeks to develop methods, practices, and forms of inquiry and narration coherent and co-operable with understandings of the mode (or modes) taken by anthropos as figure and an assemblage today.

Inquiry into the contemporary is both analytic and synthetic. It is analytic in that sets of relations must be decomposed and specified, synthetic in that these relations must be recomposed and given new form. In this sense, work on the contemporary falls within a zone of analytic consideration in that it consists of linking the recent past to the near future and the near future to the recent past.

== Anthropos as a problem ==
Rabinow's work on the anthropology of the contemporary was formally initiated by his diagnosis of anthropos (Greek, “the human thing”) as a problem today for thought, equipment, and venues. This diagnosis is carried out most systematically in his works Anthropos Today (2003) and Marking Time (2007). Rabinow describes anthropos as a being that today is burdened with multiple and heterogeneous truths about itself, a being of hetero-logoi. Modes of inquiry, methods of narration, and principles of verification must be designed in view of the “apparently unavoidable fact that anthropos is that being who suffers from too many logoi.”

It follows that in order to pose and eventually answer the question “What is anthropos today?” modes of thought are needed which not only open up new possibilities, but also discriminate significance and form truth claims into practices for the ethical life. Using a classical formulation, Rabinow argues that anthropos today is in need of paraskeue, or equipment, for forming logos into ethos. In his 1981-82 lectures at the Collège de France, Michel Foucault provided an extensive meditation on the classical notion of equipment. In those lectures, Foucault shows that in antique thought the mandate to “know thyself” was connected and oriented to an imperative to “care for thyself.” Ramifying Foucault's insight in new directions, Rabinow has posed the challenge of inventing equipment adequate to ethical and scientific problems today—contemporary equipment.

If the challenge of contemporary equipment is to develop a mode of thinking as ethical practice, it also involves the design or redesign of venues within which such formation is possible. Rabinow deals directly with the problem of venues in the work Synthetic Anthropos (with Gaymon Bennett) (2009). In that work, Rabinow and Bennett argue that the question of where and how the composition of equipment takes place is itself a primary problem site.

== Collaboration ==
A defining feature of the venues Rabinow has called for and worked on is collaboration. Understood as a mode of work, Rabinow defined collaboration in distinction to cooperation. A cooperative mode of work consists of “demarcated tasking on distinct problems and objects, with occasional if regular exchange.” Cooperation does not entail either a common definition of problems or shared techniques of remediation. A collaborative mode of work, by contrast, proceeds from an interdependent division of labor on shared problems. It entails a common definition of problems (or acceptance of a problem-space).

Rabinow called for the invention of new modes of collaboration where problem-spaces are unstable or emergent and where prior problems and their significance can no longer be taken for granted and can fruitfully be contested. Such situations require the reworking of existing modes of reasoning and intervention, adjusting these modes to the topography of the emerging problem-space. It follows that collaboration is a mode of work appropriate to the anthropology of the contemporary.

== Case work ==
Case work functions as an exercise in framing problems so as to identify potentially significant elements, relations, and interfaces. Case work underscores questions of how such material should be presented. Case work can indicate strengths and weaknesses in the venues in which inquiry is initiated and formed. Casework, therefore, is an essential aspect of inquiry neither reducible to theory nor an end-in-itself.

(a) Constructing Equipment, Can the Human and Life Science Collaborate? (SynBERC 2006–2011).

Rabinow was an investigator in the (Human) Practices Thrust of the Synthetic Biology Engineering Research Center. Synberc (Synthetic Biology Research Center) | EBRC. With Gaymon Bennett, he had been part of a collaborative effort to re-think the relationship between ethics and science within this NSF-funded Engineering Research Center. In SynBERC, the mandate from the NSF was to invent a collaborative mode of engagement such that the relationship between ethics and science might be reconceived and reworked.

(b) Chronicling Emergent Organizations (Celera Diagnostics 2003).

Rabinow, working with Talia Dan-Cohen, then an undergraduate at Berkeley, took up the challenge of chronicling Celera Diagnostic's efforts to turn the complete sequence of the human genome into tools for diagnosing molecular predispositions for pathological developments in health. The anthropological work was an experiment in thought and production, given a self-imposed one-year time limit for both research and writing. It was an experiment in collaboration involving first and second order modes of observation. The product is Rabinow and Dan-Cohen's A Machine to Make a Future: Biotech Chronicles.

(c) New Venues: Problematizing Knowledge, Care and Ethics (Centre d'Études du Polymorphisme Humain (CEPH) 1994).

The fieldwork leading up to French DNA: Trouble in Purgatory focused on a multidimensional crisis revolving around a proposal for commercial collaboration between an American biotechnology start-up company and the French laboratory that led the genome sequencing effort in France, the CEPH. As opposed to his earlier book, French Modern, French DNA is not a history of the present but an initial case study in the anthropology of the contemporary. Rabinow accepted the challenge from the center's scientific director to be a "philosophic observer." His task was to identify the formation of constellations of value judgments around new forms of scientific knowledge and to make that process available for further debate and modification, not to adjudicate disputes. The text is, in part, a meditation on committed "disinterestedness," or “a certain vocational integrity, an asceticism in Weber and Foucault's senses, a certain rigor and patience that could, lead us somewhere beyond what we already believe and know.” This work still emphasizes the observation in “participant-observation” and can be contrasted to later work at SynBERC in which both poles are put into play.

(d) New Venues of Knowledge and Commerce: The Rise of Biotech Start-up Companies, (Cetus Corporation 1980s).

Cetus Corporation (later, Roche Molecular Systems) figured as both a scientific and anthropological milieu within which to explore a highly specific set of political, economic, scientific, and legal vectors that generated a new industry as well as a major technological development, the polymerase chain reaction. Contrary to narratives of invention and discovery as the work of individual geniuses, Making PCR: A Story of Biotechnology highlights the assembling and governing of scientific and technical prowess, sustained teamwork, management skills, legal input, and material resources, all of which were necessary for this fundamental molecular biological tool to emerge, be stabilized, commercialized and to rapidly become a fundamental tool for all biological research.

(e) The Invention of Modern Equipment: (France and its Colonies 1830-1930).

French Modern: Norms and Forms of the Social Environment is a fine-grained genealogical account of the rise of the French “social” moving conceptually through domains as diverse as nineteenth century epidemiology, sociology, the Beaux Arts, colonial administration, Lamarckian biology, statistics, etc. French Modern demonstrates the century long process of bringing these domains of knowledge and practices of power slowly into a common frame of rationality and eventually into an operative apparatus characteristic of the welfare state.

(f) Philosophy as Inquiry: Fieldwork in Philosophy (Encountering Hubert Dreyfus, Robert Bellah and Michel Foucault, 1976-84).

Trained at the University of Chicago in the history of philosophy under the tutelage of Richard McKeon, where McKeon emphasized the rhetorical and pragmatic functions of philosophy (Dewey), Rabinow renewed this activity and moved beyond the work of his advisor, Clifford Geertz. Encounters with Robert Bellah and Hubert Dreyfus at UC Berkeley in the context of a National Endowment for the Humanities Fellowship year (1976–77) led to a focus on interpretive social science and ethical practice on the one hand, and an education in Heidegger and the question of technology and modern philosophy on the other. The work with Dreyfus led to a fortuitous encounter with Michel Foucault in 1979, the development of an intense dialogic working relationship, and a joint book with Dreyfus, Michel Foucault: Beyond Structuralism and Hermeneutics, as well as an anthology of Foucault's works (in consultation with Foucault), The Foucault Reader, published shortly before his death.

(g) Anthropology as Inquiry: Inheriting the Modern(Morocco, Middle Atlas Mountains 1968-1970).

The importance of colonial history, the self-understanding of descendants of an Islamic saint, the dilemma of tradition and modernity, as well as fieldwork itself, as a practice, rite, and site of self-formation, became case material for reflection. The major themes that Rabinow planned to consistently pursue for the next decades are all incipiently present in these untimely reflections: ethics as form giving, motion, and care.

== Ethical considerations about Rabinow's fieldwork in Morocco ==
While discussing the ethics of ethnography, Gary Alan Fine discusses Rabinow's work in Morocco, specifically describing the sexual relationship he had with a prostitute when the opportunity of sleeping with her was provided to him by his informant. Fine uses this as an example of one of the few cases where an ethnographer reveals such personal information, going against the general trend of eliding such details in scholarship.

== Major works ==
- Symbolic Domination: Cultural Form and Historical Change in Morocco, University of Chicago Press, 1975.
- Reflections on Fieldwork in Morocco, University of California Press, 1977. [French, Spanish, Japanese, Arabic].
- Interpretive Social Science: A Reader, with W. Sullivan, University of California Press, 1978.
- Michel Foucault, Beyond Structuralism and Hermeneutics, with Hubert Dreyfus, University of Chicago Press, 1983 (2nd edition). [French, German, Spanish, Portuguese, Chinese, Japanese, Russian.]
- The Foucault Reader, Pantheon Books, 1984.
- Interpretive Social Science: A Second Look, with W. Sullivan, University of California Press, 1987.
- French Modern: Norms and Forms of the Social Environment, MIT Press, 1989 (University of Chicago Press, 1995). [French, 2004].
- Making PCR. A Story of Biotechnology, University of Chicago Press, 1996. [French, Japanese, Chinese, Italian].
- Ethics, Subjectivity and Truth, Vol. 1 of The Essential Works of Michel Foucault 1954-1984, Series editor and editor of Vol. 1. The New Press, 1997.
- Essays in the Anthropology of Reason, Princeton University Press, 1997. [Portuguese 1999, German 2004].
- French DNA. Trouble in Purgatory, University of Chicago Press, 1999. [French 2000].
- The Essential Foucault, (with Nikolas Rose), The New Press, 2003.
- Anthropos Today: Reflections on Modern Equipment, Princeton University Press, 2003. [German 2004].
- A Machine to Make a Future: Biotech Chronicles, with Talia Dan-Cohen–2nd revised edition, Princeton University Press, 2006. (orig. 2004)
- Reflections on Fieldwork in Morocco, 30th anniversary edition with a new Preface. University of California Press, 2007. (Chinese)
- Marking Time: On the Anthropology of the Contemporary, Princeton: Princeton University Press, 2007.
- The Accompaniment: Assembling the Contemporary, University of Chicago Press, 2011.
- Designing Human Practices: An Experiment in Synthetic Biology. University of Chicago Press, 2012 (with Gaymon Bennett).
- Demands of the Day: On the Logic of Anthropological Inquiry. University of Chicago Press, 2013 (with Anthony Stavrianakis).
- Designs on the Contemporary: Anthropological Tests. University of Chicago Press, 2014 (with Anthony Stavrianakis).
- Unconsolable Contemporary: Observing Gerhard Richter. Duke University Press, 2017
- Inquiry After Modernism. ARC, Wilsted & Taylor, 2019 Open access(with Anthony Stavrianakis).
- The Privilege of Neglect: Science as a Vocation Revisited. ARC, Wilsted & Taylor, 2020 Open access.
- From Chaos to Solace: Topological Meditations. ARC, Wilsted & Taylor, 2021 Rabinow From Chaos to Solace (final).pdf (with Anthony Stavrianakis).
