= Gary Dowsett =

Australian sociologist

Gary W. Dowsett is an Australian sociologist specialising in sexual health. He is an emeritus professor at La Trobe University.

== Education ==
Dowsett obtained a Bachelor of Arts and Diploma in education from University of Queensland. He obtained a PhD from Macquarie University.

== Career ==
Dowsett has researched AIDS through the field of sociology for more than 40 years. After he was diagnosed with prostate cancer in 2007, and subsequently treated, he began researching the effects of prostate cancer in sexual and gender minorities.

== Bibliography ==
- Dowsett, G. W. (1996). Practicing desire: homosexual sex in the era of AIDS. Stanford University Press.
- Connell, Raewyn, and G. W. Dowsett (1993). Rethinking Sex: Social Theory and Sexuality Research. Temple University Press.
