= Kyle Stanford =

American philosopher

- Born: 22 April 1970 (age 56)

Education
- Education: Northwestern University (B.A.); University of California, San Diego (M.A., Ph.D.)
- Doctoral advisor: Philip Kitcher

Philosophical work
- Era: Contemporary philosophy
- Region: Western philosophy
- School: Analytic
- Institutions: University of California, Irvine
- Main interests: Philosophy of science, metaphysics, epistemology
- Notable ideas: Problem of unconceived alternatives

Kyle Stanford (born 1970) is an American philosophy professor at the University of California, Irvine, who specializes in the philosophy of science.

== Education and career ==
He earned his B.A. with Honors in Philosophy and Psychology from Northwestern University in 1991, and did his graduate work at the University of California, San Diego, earning his M.A. in philosophy, 1994, and his Ph.D. in Philosophy/Science Studies, in 1997, under the direction of Philip Kitcher.

He joined the Department of Philosophy at the University of California, Irvine in 1997, and moved to the newly created Department of Logic and Philosophy of Science there in 1998, earning tenure in 2004. He has been a visiting professor in the History and Philosophy of Science department at the University of Pittsburgh in Spring 2009.

== Selected publications ==
- Kyle Stanford (2006). Exceeding Our Grasp: Science, History, and the Problem of Unconceived Alternatives. Oxford University Press. p. 234. ISBN 0-19-517408-9.
