= BIOS Centre for the Study of Bioscience, Biomedicine, Biotechnology and Society =

UK-based research centre

The BIOS Centre for the Study of Bioscience, Biomedicine, Biotechnology and Society was an international centre for research and policy on social aspects of the life sciences and biomedicine located at the London School of Economics (LSE), England. It was founded in 2002 by Professor Nikolas Rose, a prominent British sociologist.

== About BIOS ==
BIOS was a multidisciplinary centre at LSE for research into contemporary developments in the life sciences, biomedicine and biotechnology. It was an initiative between the Department of Sociology, with the support of the Departments of Social Psychology, Government and Law and the Centre for Philosophy of Natural and Social Sciences.

BIOS supported post-doctoral researchers, visiting fellows and professors, and post graduate students. It has an infrastructure which encourages and hosts research supported by funding bodies such as the Economic and Social Research Council (ESRC), the Wellcome Trust, the Medical Research Council and other major funding bodies.

BIOS's ethos was one of empirically grounded and conceptually sophisticated research, conducted in close relation with life scientists, clinicians and policy makers. Among the issues addressed are justice, power and inequality, geopolitics, social and individual identity.

Major research projects focused on regenerative medicine, social aspects of the neurosciences and psychopharmacology, biosecurity, biopolitics, bioeconomics, translational biology and bioethics. BIOS ran an innovative Masters programme in Biomedicine and Society attracting students from backgrounds in many disciplines in the social and life sciences.

The BIOS community of over 40 researchers included a large number of doctoral students, postdoctoral fellows, research staff, visiting fellows and professors and associated faculty.

The founder and Director of BIOS was the Martin White Professor of Sociology at LSE, Professor Nikolas Rose and the Centre closed in 2012 when Nikolas Rose moved to King's College London to found the Department of Global Health and Social Medicine, which continues to develop the work initiated at BIOS.
