= Biology & Philosophy =

- Discipline: Philosophy of biology
- Language: English
- Edited by: Michael Weisberg

Publication details
- History: 1986–Present
- Publisher: Springer
- Frequency: Bimonthly
- Impact factor: 1.461 (2020)

Standard abbreviations
- ISO 4: Biol. Philos.

Indexing
- CODEN: BIOPEI
- ISSN: 0169-3867 (print); 1572-8404 (web)
- LCCN: 86642996
- OCLC no.: 13073787

Links
- Journal homepage

Biology & Philosophy is a peer-reviewed academic journal that publishes articles about philosophy of biology, broadly understood to span conceptual, theoretical, and methodological issues in the biological sciences.

The journal was founded by Michael Ruse in 1986, edited by him from 1986 to 2000, then edited by Kim Sterelny from 2000 to 2016, and it is currently edited by Michael Weisberg. It is published by Springer.

Remarking on the journal, David Sloan Wilson wrote: "Biology and Philosophy provided a forum for a new breed of philosopher who regarded biology as a different type of science that need not and indeed should not be compared to physics."

== Abstracting and indexing ==
The journal is abstracted and indexed in the following databases

- Academic OneFile
- Academic Search
- Arts & Humanities Citation Index
- Biological Abstracts
- BIOSIS
- Current Abstracts
- Current Contents/Arts and Humanities
- Dietrich's Index Philosophicus
- EBSCO
- EMBiology
- ERIH
- Gale
- GEOBASE
- International Bibliography of Book Reviews
- International Bibliography of Periodical Literature
- ISIS Current Bibliography of the History of Science
- OmniFile
- Répertoire Bibliographique de la Philosophie
- Science Citation Index
- Journal Citation Reports/Science Edition
- Journal Citation Reports/Social Sciences Edition
- Social Sciences Citation Index
- Social SciSearch
- SCOPUS
- Science Select
- SCImago
- Summon by Serial Solutions
- The Philosopher's Index
- Zoological Record

According to the Journal Citation Reports, the journal has a 2020 impact factor of 1.461.
