= Jane Maienschein =

American professor, biologist (born 1950)

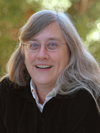
- Born: September 23, 1950 (age 75); Tennessee, US
- Scientific career
- Fields: History and philosophy of biology
- Institutions: Center for Biology and Society at Arizona State University

Jane Maienschein (born September 23, 1950) is an American professor and director of the Center for Biology and Society at Arizona State University.

== Early life and education ==
Maienschein was born on September 23, 1950. She was admitted to the Massachusetts Institute of Technology, but transferred to Yale University in 1969, where she was a member of Manuscript Society. In 1972, she graduated with honors in History, the Arts, and Letters. She then attended Indiana University Bloomington to conduct her Ph.D work.

Her mentor, Dr. Frederick Churchill, was interested in historical embryological research. She was awarded a fellowship at the Smithsonian, to study the history of microscopy. The National Science Foundation provided funding for her dissertation. Maienschein joined the Marine Biological Laboratory in Woods Hole, Massachusetts, to research historical embryology, morphogenesis, and cellular differentiation. She researched the history and philosophy of developmental biology and issues surrounding stem cell research and regenerative medicine.

== Work ==
Maienschein focuses on the social, political, and legal contexts of scientific research and is currently the director of the Center for Biology and Society at Arizona State University, which states the goal of "promoting exploration of conceptual foundations and historical development of the biosciences and their diverse interactions with society". To quote the CBS, "We engage in activities across multiple disciplines that allow opportunities for intellectual ferment and increased impact by creating research and educational collaborations and communication." Maienschein and colleague Manfred Laubichler are particularly interested in evolutionary developmental biology. The School of Life Sciences has received millions of dollars from the Howard Hughes Medical Institute to develop the School of Life Sciences Undergraduate Research (SOLUR) program, a research program. Maienschein served as the first president for the International Society for the History, Philosophy, and Social Studies of Biology in 1989–1991 and served as president of the History of Science Society. She is director of The Embryo Project Encyclopedia, along with Dr. Manfred Laubichler. This project, along with her other work in embryonic research, gives context to greater political, philosophical, and existential debates on what constitutes human life.

== Recognition ==
Maienschein is Regents' Professor and President's Professor at Arizona State University's School of Life Sciences. In 2000, Maienschein received the Joseph H. Hazen Education Prize from the History of Science Society, and in 2024 she received the History of Science Society's highest honor, the George Sarton Medal.

Maienschein has created the Biology and Society; Bioethics, Policy, and Law; The History and Philosophy of Science; Ecology, Economics, Ethics and Environment; The Embryo Project Encyclopedia, ASU's Bioethics in Films Series, Responsible Conduct in Research and the History of Biology projects held at the Marine Biological Laboratory. She is also the first president of the International Society for the History, Philosophy, and Social Studies of Biology (ISHPSSB).

Maienschein is a fellow of the Association for Women in Science (AWIS) and the American Association for the Advancement of Science (AAAS), has served two terms as a board member for national AWIS in Washington, D.C and served on the board of directors of AAAS. She has published over 20 articles and several books as shown on her CV. She was published in the Stanford Encyclopedia of Philosophy on "Epigenesis and Preformation". Maienschein wrote "Whose View of Life?: Embryos, Cloning, and Stem Cells". Maienschein and Manfred Laubichler collaborated to co-write: "From Embryology to Evo-Devo: A History of Developmental Evolution" and Form and Function in Developmental Evolution.

In 2009, Maienschein presented, with Tedx Talks, on "Stem Cells, Regenerative Medicine and Us". In November 2010, Maienschein was named the 2010 Arizona Professor of the Year, by the Carnegie Foundation for the Advancement of Teaching and the Council for Advancement and Support of Education.
