= Hannah Landecker =

American historian and sociologist (born 1969)

- Born: 1969 (age 56–57)

Academic background
- Education: University of British Columbia (BSc); Massachusetts Institute of Technology (PhD)

Academic work
- Discipline: Sociology; Anthropology
- Sub-discipline: History of science
- Institutions: Rice University; University of Texas Medical Branch; University of California, Los Angeles

Hannah L. Landecker (born 1969) is an Australian historian and sociologist working as a professor of sociology at the University of California, Los Angeles and its Institute for Society and Genetics.

== Early life and education ==
Landecker was born in 1969 in Sydney, Australia. She earned a Bachelor of Science degree from the University of British Columbia (1993) and a PhD from the Massachusetts Institute of Technology (2000).

== Career ==
Landecker's research interests are the social and historical study of biotechnology and life science and the intersections of biology and technology, with a particular focus on cells and the in vitro conditions of life in research settings. Landecker was assistant professor of anthropology at Rice University through 2007. She was a visiting scholar at University of Texas Medical Branch in 2004, where she worked on a project that examined the changing human relationship to living matter in an age of biotechnology. She has also worked on developing new methods and curricula for teaching the history and social study of biotechnology to undergraduates. Recent work includes looking at ways in which antibiotic resistance has become a key marker of the Anthropocene.

== Publications ==
- Culturing Life: How Cells Became Technologies; Harvard University Press (2007)
- Cellular Features: Microcinematography and Early Film Theory, Critical Inquiry 31(4):903-937. (2005)
- Living Differently in Time: Plasticity, Temporality, and Cellular Biotechnologies, Culture Machine 7 (2005)
- Immortality, In Vitro: A History of the HeLa Cell Line. Biotechnology and Culture: Bodies, Anxieties, Ethics, ed. Paul Brodwin; Indiana University Press: 53–74. (2000)
