= Melinda Cooper (scholar) =

Australian sociologist and political theorist

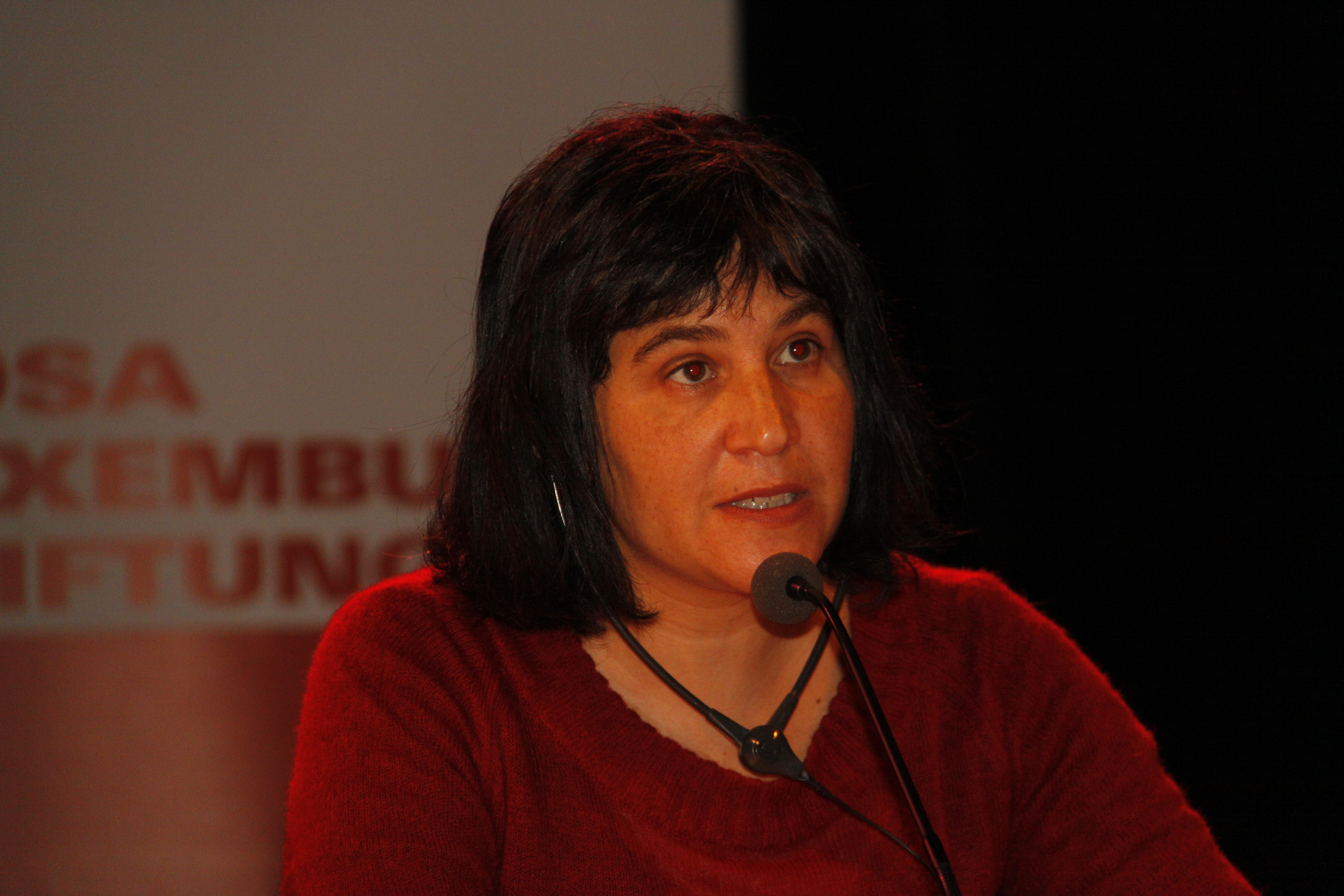
- Education: Université Paris 8 Vincennes-Saint-Denis
- Known for: biopolitics, role of family in neoliberal economy, austerity policies
- Scientific career
- Fields: Political economy Political sociology History of capitalism
- Workplaces: Australian National University
- Thesis: Nouvelle alliance, nouvelle naissance: la question de la genèse dans la pensée de Deleuze et Guattari

Melinda Cooper is an Australian sociologist and political theorist. Her work deals with the political economy of neoliberalism, biopolitics and the history of capitalism.

== Biography ==
Cooper holds a PhD from the Université Paris 8 Vincennes-Saint-Denis. She is currently a professor of sociology at the Australian National University, and editorial advisor to the Phenomenal World book series, edited by Chicago University Press.

She has worked extensively on biopolitics and bioeconomy. Life as Surplus (2008) traced the links between the history of biotechnology and the rise of neoliberalism, looking at scientific, economic, political, and cultural elements. Clinical Labor (2014), published with Australian sociologist Catherine Waldby, focused on the embodied labor of those working as donors and research subjects in the field of assisted reproduction and experimental drug trials. It suggested that this form of labor posed important challenges to traditional conceptions of labor.

Her book Family Values (2017) argued that family is central to the development of neoliberal policies such as free market and cuts in public spending. In particular, she states that the neoliberal project entailed shifting the responsibility for deficit spending from the state to the household, in what she sees as an actualization of American poverty laws. The importance of the family as the responsible for this structural role would have facilitated the alliance between seemingly incompatible neoliberal and neoconservative political actors.

In 2024 Cooper published Counterrevolution: Extravagance and Austerity in Public Finance, named a New Statesman Best Book of the Academic Presses.

== Books ==
=== As sole author ===
- Life as Surplus: Biotechnology and Capitalism in the Neoliberal Era (University of Washington Press, 2008).
- Family Values: Between Neoliberalism and the New Social Conservatism (Zone Books, 2017). Re-published in 2019 by Princeton University Press. Translated to Spanish by Traficantes de Sueños.
- Counterrevolution: Extravagance and Austerity in Public Finance (Zone Books/Princeton University Press, 2024).

=== As co-author ===
- Clinical Labor: Tissue Donors and Research Subjects in the Global Bioeconomy (with Catherine Waldby) (Duke University Press, 2014). Translated to German by Assemblage.
- The Asset Economy (with Lisa Adkins and Martijn Konings) (Polity, 2020). Translated to German by Hamburger Edition.

=== As editor ===
- The Sage Handbook of Neoliberalism (with Damien Cahill and Martijn Konings) (Sage, 2018).
