= From Darwin to Hitler =

2002 book by Richard Weikart

From Darwin to Hitler: Evolutionary Ethics, Eugenics and Racism in Germany
- Cover of the first edition
- Author: Richard Weikart
- Language: English
- Subjects: Evolutionary ethics, Nazism
- Publisher: Palgrave MacMillan
- Publication date: 2004
- Publication place: United States
- Media type: Print (Hardcover and Paperback)
- Pages: 312
- ISBN: 1-4039-6502-1
- OCLC: 53485256
- Dewey Decimal: 305.8/00943 22
- LC Class: HQ755.5.G3 W435 2004
- Preceded by: Socialist Darwinism
- Followed by: Hitler's Ethic

From Darwin to Hitler: Evolutionary Ethics, Eugenics, and Racism in Germany is a 2004 book by Richard Weikart, a historian at California State University, Stanislaus, and a senior fellow for the Center for Science and Culture of the creationist Discovery Institute. The work is controversial. Graeme Gooday, John M. Lynch, Kenneth G. Wilson, and Constance K. Barsky wrote that "numerous reviews have accused Weikart of selectively viewing his rich primary material, ignoring political, social, psychological, and economic factors" that helped shape Nazi eugenics and racism.

== Background and summary ==
The Discovery Institute, the hub of the intelligent design movement, "provided crucial funding" for the book's research. The Institute operates DarwinToHitler.com, which promotes the book and intelligent design. Prominent historian and critic of the intelligent design movement, Barbara Forest, states that the book is tied to the DI's 'wedge strategy' of attacking Darwinian science as morally corrupting. This strategy aims to "defeat [the] materialist world view" represented by the theory of evolution in favor of "a science consonant with Christian and theistic convictions."

Weikart has appeared in creationist films promoting the book. In 2006, Weikart appeared in Coral Ridge Ministries' creationist film Darwin's Deadly Legacy in which Weikart claims "Darwinian ideology is the core" of Nazism and D. James Kennedy concludes: "To put it simply, no Darwin, no Hitler." In 2008, Weikart, a supporter of intelligent design, also appeared in Expelled: No Intelligence Allowed, a pro-intelligent design movie, which among other claims, strongly implies that Charles Darwin's ideas led to Adolf Hitler's atrocities. Bret Carroll, Weikart's colleague in the Stanislaus history department, wrote: "That 'intelligent design' is not a scientific theory" and the Expelled movie "misuses Weikart's research by mistakenly implying that Darwin led inevitably to Hitler. In fact, scientific theories, even those like Darwin's that address organic life, are morally neutral."

== Academic reception ==
Academic reviewers are critical of the book citing Weikart's selective use of primary sources and ignoring a range of developments that shaped Nazi ideology. In 2004, Sander Gliboff, professor of History and Philosophy of Science at Indiana University, criticized the work writing that "It is dismaying to see such opinions being passed off as results of scholarly research." In 2005, Angela Zimmerman, a professor of German history, reviewed it in the American Historical Review, writing "Weikart presents an image of Darwinism at once both too narrow and too broad." Zimmerman wrote:

The German Darwinians who are the focus of the book appear only as advocates of eugenics, racism, and imperialism, although presumably these policies were informed by a broader intellectual project. At the same time, German anthropologists, who opposed Darwinism before the turn of the century (as a doctrine possessing no more empirical foundation than revealed religion does), are lumped with Darwinists, since these anthropologists also supported imperialism and racist hierarchies.

Weikart replied to Zimmerman's criticism with a letter to the editor to which Zimmerman offered a rebuttal saying Weikart's work "is anachronistic, projecting present‐day theocratic agendas onto the history of science in Imperial Germany."

Nils Roll-Hansen, historian and philosopher of 19th and 20th-century biology at University of Oslo, also reviewed the work in 2005 and was critical of it in a review published by Isis calling it "selective" and containing "insufficient attention to historical change—leaving out political, social, and economic factors as well as the role of new knowledge in genetics-make his overall argument unconvincing." Jonathan Judaken, professor of History at University of Memphis, wrote that while it is a "significant study," he "fails to follow the rich nuances of the discourse/practices and institutions that have preoccupied the contemporary generation of intellectual historians, who have paid attention to the continuities and ruptures within systems of thought. So his presentation of racism, for example, reiterates a rationale that does not stand up to the critical scrutiny of intellectual history." Larry Arnhart, a professor of Political Science at Northern Illinois University wrote "Weikart doesn't actually show any direct connection between Darwin and Hitler. In fact, Weikart has responded to my criticisms by admitting that the title of his book is misleading, since he cannot show any direct link between Darwin's ideas and Hitler's Nazism."

Also in 2005, science historian Paul Lawrence Farber wrote in the Journal of the History of Biology that "Like other attempts to tar Darwin with all of the problems of modernity, Weikart's suffers from conceptual flaws that detract from his book, which contains some interesting material on the German eugenics movement, popular Darwinism in Germany, and German evolutionary ethics." He concluded "Weikart's book, unfortunately, is likely to spawn more urban myths about Darwin that will have to be addressed."

In 2006, Robert J. Richards, historian of Darwin and eugenics at University of Chicago, wrote "It can only be a tendentious and dogmatically driven assessment that would condemn Darwin for the crimes of the Nazis." Richards more pointedly concluded "Hitler was not a Darwinian" and "calls this all a desperate tactic to undermine evolution." Richards explained, "There's not the slightest shred of evidence that Hitler read Darwin," and "Some of the biggest influences on Hitler's anti-Semitism were opposed to evolution, such as British writer Houston Stewart Chamberlain, whose racial theory became incorporated into Nazi doctrine."

Similarly, historian Marius Turda's review asks why Weikart's book did not focus on "some authors who actually are credited with influencing Hitler, such as Jörg Lanz von Liebenfels, the Viennese Aryan racist who formulated the doctrine of Ariosophy, or Guido von List, another Viennese occult racist, or Josef Reimer, author of A Pan-German Germany (1905) (whom Weikart discusses cursorily)."

Also in a review that same year Helmut Walser Smith of Vanderbilt University writes that the book's "larger argument remains too narrowly conceived," as elements of Nazism, including "nationalism and anti-Sermitism make cameo appearances, for example, but their power is hardly gauged." He concludes saying it is "a thesis on a tight rope," which is "convincing as long as one does not look down."

In 2006, Ann Taylor Allen, a professor of German history at the University of Louisville, reviewed Weikart's book for The Journal of Modern History. She explained that Weikart's talk about "Darwinism" is not based on any careful reading of Darwin himself but on vague ideas by a variety of people who presented themselves as "Darwinian." Moreover, fundamental elements of Nazism like anti-Semitism cannot be attributed to Darwinism since they predate evolutionary theory. Allen concluded:

This picture of the Holocaust as the outcome of a 'culture war' between religion and science leads to serious distortions on both sides. The 'Judeo-Christian' worldview is unproblematically associated here with many beliefs — such as opposition to birth control, legalized abortion, and assisted suicide — that many believing Christians and Jews would reject. And 'Darwinism' is equated with a hodgepodge of ideas about race, politics, and social issues. If all these ideas were to fall into well-deserved obsolescence, this would in no way detract from the validity of Darwin's contributions to modern biological science. Neither religion nor science is well served by this oversimplified view of their complex history.

In 2007, Hector Avalos, a professor of Religious Studies and founder of Iowa State University's Atheist and Agnostic Society, wrote an essay for the anti-Creationism site Talk.reason with the purpose of "exposing the historical flaws found in the work of Weikart" and argued "that the defense of genocide, infanticide and "eugenics" by creationists actually has a very venerable and lengthy tradition that precedes Darwin." In a May 2008 debate with Weikart, Avalos criticized Weikart's quoting of Darwin.

In 2009, historian Peter J. Bowler of Queen's University wrote in Notes and Records of the Royal Society that Weikart's book reflects a "simple blame game in which (for example) Darwin and Haeckel are accused of paving the way for Nazism," and criticized him and others for associating Darwin "with distasteful social policies" using a "remarkably simple-minded approach".

Besides criticisms from historians, Weikart was criticized by Jeff Schloss, professor at Westmont College and former Discovery Institute fellow, in the Christian American Scientific Affiliation's publication regarding the Expelled film. Schloss wrote that the "ideas that are attributed to Darwin (such as natural selection makes might right in social policy) were actually not advocated but repudiated by Darwin and his immediate colleagues." Weikart wrote a response.

== Bibliography ==
- Weikart, Richard (2004). From Darwin to Hitler: Evolutionary Ethics, Eugenics, and Racism in Germany. Palgrave Macmillan. ISBN 978-1-4039-7201-9.
- Richards, Robert J. (2013). Was Hitler a Darwinian?: Disputed Questions in the History of Evolutionary Theory. Chicago: University of Chicago Press. pp. 192–242. ISBN 978-0-226-05893-1.
