= Benjamin Wiker =

American ethicist

- Born: January 1, 1960 (age 66); United States
- Education: Furman University (BA); Vanderbilt University (MA, PhD)
- Occupations: Ethicist, author, professor
- Era: Contemporary philosophy
- Employer: Franciscan University of Steubenville
- Known for: Writings on ethics, intelligent design, and criticism of Darwinism
- Notable work: Moral Darwinism, 10 Books That Screwed Up the World, The Darwin Myth

Benjamin Wiker (born 1960) is an American ethicist and professor of political science and human life studies at Franciscan University of Steubenville.

== Biography ==
Benjamin Wiker obtained his PhD in theological ethics from Vanderbilt University then went on to teach at a variety of institutions including Marquette University, Saint Mary's University of Minnesota, Thomas Aquinas College, and the Franciscan University of Steubenville. He came to attention in 2002 with the publication of Moral Darwinism: How We Became Hedonists. In this book, Wiker aims to show how Darwinism by its very nature completely undermines the ethical foundations of Christianity, Judaism, and Islam because what he sees as its materialist cosmology is incompatible with any concept of natural law. Wiker became a member of the Discovery Institute, a think tank supporting this idea and intelligent design, soon after the publication of the book.

His next book, Architects of the Culture of Death, co-written with veteran Catholic ethicist Donald DeMarco, looks at how the most influential thinkers of the nineteenth and twentieth centuries from Schopenhauer to Peter Singer have undermined the Christian value of "sanctity of life". 2008's 10 Books That Screwed Up the World looks at fifteen important books from The Prince to The Feminine Mystique and aims, following Paul Johnson and E. Michael Jones, to show how the actual lives of these thinkers led to fundamentally distorted views about human nature, morality, and sexuality.

The Darwin Myth is a biography of Charles Darwin which portrays Darwin as a good husband and a kind, charitable person and claims Darwin was involved in an ideological conspiracy by members of the late Enlightenment which aimed to remove God from science.

== Reception ==
John M. Lynch in a review for The Darwin Myth in the Journal of the History of Biology dismissed Wiker's claims as irrational. Sander Gliboff, a Professor of the History and Philosophy of Science at Indiana University, in a review of the book for the National Center for Science Education, criticized Wiker's claims as "fanciful" and further adds that for the most part these claims "have been refuted many times since". He also said Wiker's biographical interpretations of Darwin "verge on fantasy"

== Bibliography ==
- Moral Darwinism: How We Became Hedonists (with William A. Dembski), InterVarsity Press, 2002. ISBN 0-8308-2666-1
- The Mystery of the Periodic Table (with Jeanne Bendick), Bethlehem, 2003. ISBN 1-883937-71-X
- Architects of the Culture of Death (with Donald DeMarco), Ignatius, 2004.
- Answering the New Atheism: Dismantling Dawkins' Case Against God (with Scott Hahn), Emmaus Road, 2006. ISBN 1-931018-48-0
- A Meaningful World: How the Arts And Sciences Reveal the Genius of Nature (with Jonathan Witt), InterVarsity PressInterVarsity Press, 2006. ISBN 0-8308-2799-4
- 10 Books That Screwed Up the World (And 5 Others That Didn't Help), Regnery, 2008. ISBN 1-59698-055-9
- The Darwin Myth: The Life and Lies of Charles Darwin, Regnery, 2009. ISBN 1-59698-097-4
- 10 Books Every Conservative Must Read: Plus Four Not to Miss and One Impostor, Regnery, 2010 ISBN 1-59698-604-2
- The Catholic Church & Science: Answering the Questions, Exposing the Myths, TAN Books, 2011. ISBN 978-0-89555-910-4
- Worshipping the State: How Liberalism Became Our State Religion, Regnery, 2013. ISBN 978-1621570295
