= Big Spring High School =

Location
- 707 E 11th Place; Big Spring, Texas 79720-4648; United States; 32.2471752°N 101.4658803°W

Information
- School type: Public high school
- Opened: March 23, 1952; 74 years ago
- School district: Big Spring Independent School District
- Principal: Mike Ritchey
- Staff: 87.60 (FTE)
- Grades: 9–12
- Enrollment: 1,044 (2023–2024)
- Student to teacher ratio: 11.92
- Colors: Black & Gold
- Athletics conference: UIL Class AAAA
- Mascot: Steers/Lady Steers
- Website: Big Spring High School

Big Spring High School is a public high school located in Big Spring, Texas, and classified as a 4A Division I school by the University Interscholastic League (UIL). It is part of the Big Spring Independent School District located in north central Howard County. The high school building was dedicated on March 23, 1952. The dedication address was given by J.W. Edgar, State Commissioner of Education. This was the first new high school built in 35 years, and the third in the district's history. In 2015, the school was rated "Met Standard" by the Texas Education Agency.

== UIL academic events ==
The Big Spring Steers compete in the following UIL academic events. Events below have both team and individual components unless specifically noted otherwise. Sanctioned high school academic events are:

- Accounting
- Calculator applications
- Computer applications (individual competition only)
- Computer science
- Congressional debate
- Current issues and events
- Literary criticism
- Mathematics
- Number sense
- Ready writing (individual competition only)
- Science
- Social studies
- Spelling and vocabulary
- Speech (an award is given to the top overall school in speech events; the award does not qualify students for advancement)
  - Cross-examination team debate (team competition only)
  - Lincoln-Douglas debate (individual competition only)
  - Extemporaneous speaking (individual competition only)
  - Poetry interpretation (individual competition only)
  - Prose interpretation (individual competition only)
  - Congressional debate
- Journalism (an award is given to the top overall school in journalism events; the award does not qualify students for advancement)
  - Editorial writing (individual competition only)
  - Feature writing (individual competition only)
  - Headline writing (individual competition only)
  - News writing (individual competition only)
- One act play (team competition plus individual awards that do not lead to advancement)

== UIL academic state meet ==
=== State titles ===
Individual

- Calculator applications
  - 2022 (4A), 2023 (4A)
- Congressional debate
  - 2016 (4A), 2024 (4A)
- Editorial writing
  - 1990(4A)
- Feature writing
  - 2008(4A)
- Lincoln-Douglas debate
  - 2005(4A), 2011(3A), 2015(4A), 2016(4A)
- Mathematics
  - 2022 (4A)
- News writing
  - 2009(4A)
- Number sense
  - 2009(4A)
- Persuasive speaking
  - 2011(3A)
- Prose interpretation
  - 1978(4A), 1979(4A)
- Spelling
  - 1977(4A), 2001(4A), 2023 (4A)
- Typing
  - 1948(2A)

Team

- Journalism
  - 2004(4A), 2009(4A)
- Speech
  - 2016 (4A)

==== Other state placings ====
- 1947
  - 3rd place Shorthand
- 1990
  - 2nd place News Writing
- 2002
  - Octa-finalists: cross-examination debate
- 2003
  - 3rd place persuasive extemporaneous speaking
- 2004
  - 2nd place Persuasive Extemporaneous Speaking
  - 2nd place: Headline Writing
  - 2nd place: News Writing
  - 3rd place: Lincoln-Douglas Debate
  - 4th place: News Writing
  - 6th place Informative Extemporaneous Speaking
- 2005
  - 3rd place Persuasive Extemporaneous Speaking
  - 3rd place: Feature Writing
  - 6th place Poetry Interpretation
- 2006
  - Quarter-finalists: cross-examination debate
- 2009
  - 2nd place: Feature Writing
  - 3rd place: Headline Writing
  - 3rd place: Literary Criticism
- 2010
  - 3rd place Persuasive Extemporaneous Speaking
  - Octa-finalists: cross-examination debate
- 2012
  - 3rd place Lincoln-Douglas Debate
- 2014
  - Octafinalist Cross-examination Debate
  - 5th place Speaker, Cross-examination State Meet
  - 3rd place Informative Extemporaneous Speaking
  - 3rd place Lincoln-Douglas Debate
  - 4th place Informative Extemporaneous Speaking
- 2015
  - 5th place Congressional Debate 4A
  - 4th place Editorial Writing
  - 5th place Ready Writing
  - 5th place Persuasive Extemporaneous Speaking
- 2016
  - 2nd place Congressional Debate 4A
  - 3rd place Cross-examination Debate 4A
  - Bronze Gavel Speaker, Cross-Examination State Meet
  - 2nd place News Writing 4A
  - 2nd place Persuasive Speaking 4A
  - 3rd place Persuasive Speaking 4A
  - 5th place Editorial Writing 4A
- 2017
  - Octafinalist Cross-Examination State Meet 4A
  - 3rd place Ready Writing 4A
  - 3rd place Informative Speaking
  - 4th place Editorial Writing 4A
- 2019
  - Octafinalist Cross-Examination State Meet 4A
- 2021
  - 5th place Linconln-Douglas Debate
  - 2nd place Calculator Applications
  - 4th place Spelling & Vocabulary
- 2022
  - Quarter-finalist Cross-Examination State Meet 4A
  - 5th place Speaker Cross-Examination
  - 3rd place Persuasive Speaking 4A
  - 3rd place Literary Criticism
  - 5th place Spelling and Vocabulary 4A
  - 6th place Informative Speaking 4A
  - 2nd place Spelling and Vocabulary Team 4A
- 2023
  - 5th place Congress 4A
  - Octa-finalists Cross Examination State Meet 4A
  - 4th place Speaker Cross-Examination
  - 2nd place LD Debate 4A
  - 2nd place Mathematics 4A
  - 2nd place Science 4A
    - 2nd Physics
    - 2nd Chemistry
  - 2nd place News Writing 4A
  - 3rd place Persuasive Speaking 4A
  - 4th place Number Sense 4A
  - 5th place Informative Speaking 4A
  - 2nd place Science Team 4A
  - 3rd place Speech & Debate Team 4A
  - 3rd place Spelling Team 4A
- 2024
  - 3rd place LD Debate 4A
  - 3rd place Poetry Interpretation 4A
  - 6th place Informative Speaking 4A
- 2026
  - 6th Place Cross-Examination State Meet 4A
  - Silver Gavel Cross-Examination

== Athletics ==
The Big Spring Steers compete in these sports: cross country, volleyball, football, basketball, powerlifting, swimming, golf, tennis, track, softball & baseball.

The school competes in class 4A in all sports except for swimming and diving which competes in class 5A

=== State titles ===
Team

- Boys cross country
  - 2006(4A)

Individual

- Boys triple jump
  - 2010(4A)
- Girls long jump
  - 2011(3A)
- Boys 800 meter
  - 2016 (4A)
- Boys 800 meter
  - 2017 (4A)
- Girls triple jump
  - 2017 (4A)

=== State finalists ===
- Football
  - 1953(3A)
- Baseball
  - 1994(4A)

=== State semi-finalists ===
- Volleyball
  - 2013 (3A)

=== Other state placings ===
- 2011(3A)
  - 2nd place girls long jump
  - 2nd place boys long jump
  - 2nd place girls 400 relay
  - 2nd place girls 800 relay
  - 3rd place triple jump
  - Girls track 2nd place team
- 2012(3A)
  - 9th place boys powerlifting SHW
- 2017 (4A)
  - 2nd place boys 1600 relay
  - 4th place boys 400 meter
  - 5th place boys 300 hurdles
  - 6th place boys 400 relay
  - 6th place boys 800 relay
  - 4th place girls 400 meter
  - 4th place girls discus

2021 (4A)

  - 4th place boys discus

2022(4A D1)

  - 7th Place Boys powerlifting 123
  - 7th Place Girls powerlifting 132
  - 7th Place Girls Powerlifting 220
  - 8th Place Girls Powerlifting 259+
  - 2nd Place Girls Powerlifting 259

2023(4A D1)

  - 5th Place Girls Powerlifting 220
  - 4th Place Girls Powerlifting 259+
  - 2nd Place Girls Powerlifting 259+

== Notable alumni ==
- Larry Arnhart- writer and scholar, graduated from Big Spring High School in 1967.
- Dan Birdwell - defensive tackle for the Oakland Raiders
- Ken Coffey - safety for the Washington Redskins
- Olie Cordill - halfback for the Cleveland Rams
- Jim Evans - wide receiver for the New York Jets
- Bob Flowers - center for the Green Bay Packers
- Bubba Franks - Green Bay Packers tight end; although born in California, was raised and played high school football in Big Spring.
- Tony Franklin - Philadelphia Eagles, New England Patriots, Miami Dolphins; barefoot kicker set 18 NCAA records playing at Texas A&M, He led the NFL in scoring (140 points) and field goals made (32) in 1986 and was selected to represent the AFC in the Pro Bowl. Played in super Bowl XV and super Bowl XX
- Charley Johnson - quarterback for the St. Louis Cardinals
- Cliff Patton - guard for the Philadelphia Eagles
- Stephan Pyles - Chef and restaurateur. Owner of Stephan Pyles, Samar, and Stampede 66 in Dallas.
- J. T. Smith — wide receiver for the St. Louis and Phoenix Cardinals, Washington Redskins and Kansas City Chiefs. Played 13 years in the NFL, then coached the San Angelo indoor team. Played at North Texas State after finishing at Big Spring High School. He was inducted to the Big Spring Hall of Fame and in 2002. JT was named to the AFC Pro Bowl team in 1980 and the NFC Pro Bowl team in 1988. He also led the NFL in total punt returns in 1979 & 1980.
- Ryan Tannehill - quarterback for the Tennessee Titans
- Charlie West - safety for the Minnesota Vikings
