= Lisa Jardine =

British historian (1944–2015)

Lisa Jardine CBE HonFRS FRHistS
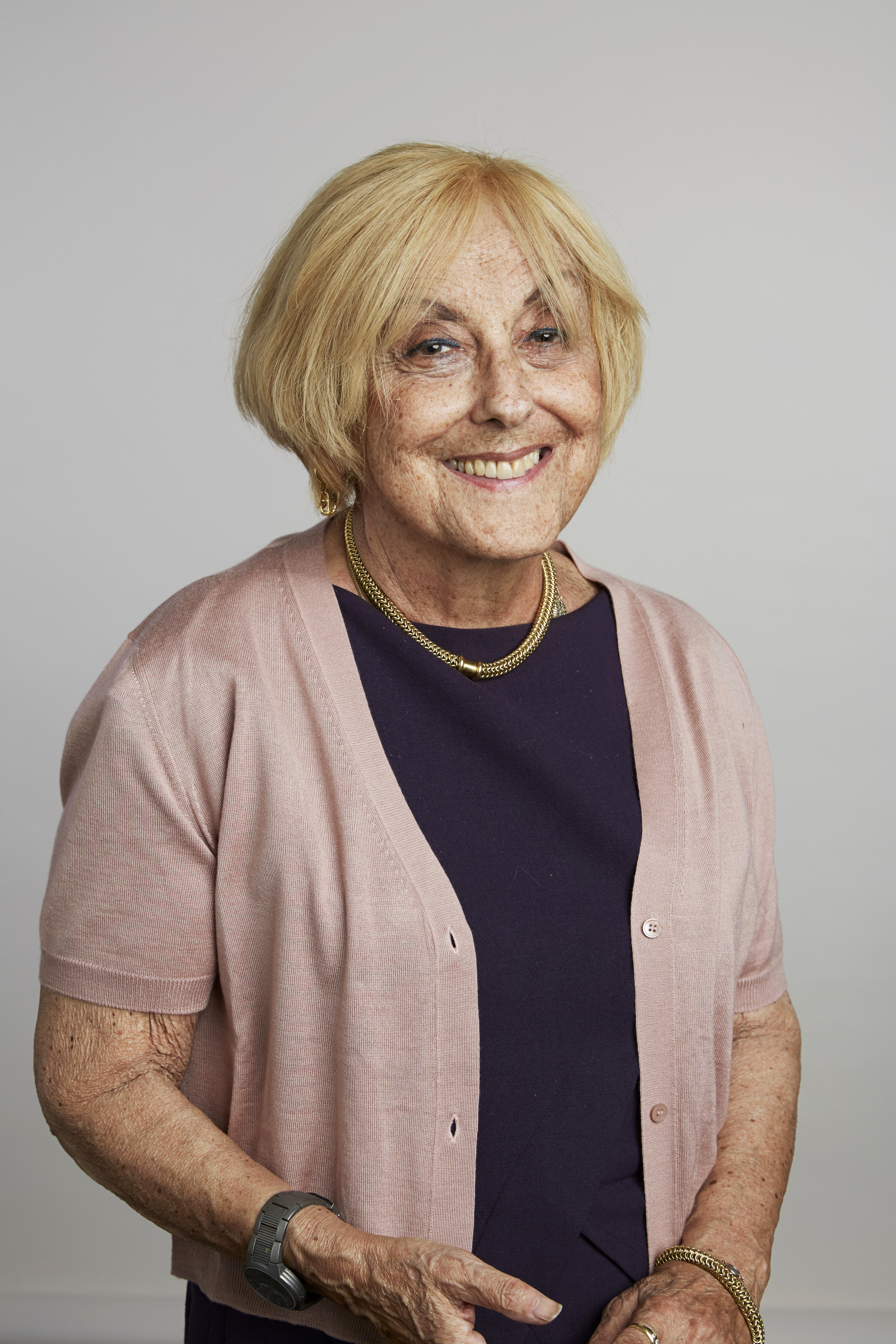
- Jardine at the Royal Society admissions day in 2015
- Born: Lisa Anne Bronowski; 12 April 1944; Oxford, England
- Died: 25 October 2015 (aged 71); London, England
- Spouses: Nick Jardine (m. 1969; div. 1979); John Robert Hare (m. 1982)
- Parents: Jacob Bronowski; Rita Coblentz

Academic background
- Education: Newnham College, Cambridge; University of Essex

Academic work
- Discipline: History
- Sub-discipline: Early modern history
- Institutions: Queen Mary University of London; University College London

Lisa Anne Jardine (née Bronowski; 12 April 1944 – 25 October 2015) was a British historian of the early modern period.

From 1990 to 2011, she was Centenary Professor of Renaissance Studies and director of the Centre for Editing Lives and Letters at Queen Mary University of London. From 2008 to January 2014, she was Chair of the Human Fertilisation and Embryology Authority (HFEA).

Jardine was a Member of Council of the Royal Institution, until 2009. On 1 September 2012, she relocated with her research centre and staff to University College London (UCL) to become founding director of its Centre for Interdisciplinary Research in the Humanities.

== Education and personal life ==
Jardine was born on 12 April 1944 in Oxford, the eldest of four daughters of mathematician and polymath Jacob Bronowski and the sculptor Rita Coblentz.

Bronowski, who died in 1974 and is best remembered for his 13-part television series, The Ascent of Man (1973), was the subject of Jardine's Conway Memorial Lecture, "Things I Never Knew About My Father", delivered at the Conway Hall Ethical Society on 26 June 2014.

An avid reader with an interest in history from a very young age, Jardine won a mathematics scholarship to Cheltenham Ladies' College and later attended Newnham College, Cambridge, and the University of Essex. For two years, she took the Cambridge Mathematical Tripos before, in her final year and under the influence of Raymond Williams, she read English. She graduated with upper second-class honours. Fluent in eight languages (including Greek and Latin), she studied for an MA in the Literary Theory of Translation with Professor Donald Davie at the University of Essex. She was awarded a PhD from the University of Cambridge with a dissertation on Francis Bacon: Discovery and the Art of Discourse (subsequently published by Cambridge University Press).

In striking out on her own career path, Jardine recalled that she initially found her father's celebrity something of a burden, noting that she was "very, very conscious" of being his daughter. When in 1969 she married Cambridge historian and philosopher of science Nicholas Jardine, she was relieved to assume her husband's surname, which she continued to use after the couple's divorce in 1979. The couple had a son and a daughter. "Until 1999, the name Bronowski never occurred in cuttings about me, and it was broadly unknown that I was his daughter," she later stated. In 1982, she married architect John Hare, with whom she had one son. She was reported to have said that her greatest achievement was her three "well-balanced children".

Jardine had been raised in a secular Jewish household, but when appointed new chair of the Human Fertilisation and Embryology Authority, Britain's fertility regulator, she expressed her loyalty to her observant grandparents' Orthodox Jewish faith, which she described as going back "all the way back to whenever—Abraham", and her reluctance to clash with the Catholic Church on embryology.

== Career and research ==
Jardine was professor of Renaissance studies at Queen Mary University of London, where she was director of the Centre for Interdisciplinary Research in the Humanities and director of the Centre for Editing Lives and Letters. She was a Fellow of the Royal Historical Society, and a Fellow and Honorary Fellow of King's College and Jesus College, Cambridge.

She was a trustee of the Victoria and Albert Museum for eight years, and was for five years a member of the Council of the Royal Institution in London. She was Patron of the Archives and Records Association and the Orange Prize. For the academic year 2007–2008 she was seconded to the Royal Society in London as Expert Advisor to its Collections. She was a Trustee of the Chelsea Physic Garden.

From 2008 to 2014, she served as chair of the Human Fertilisation and Embryology Authority—the UK government regulator for assisted reproduction. In December 2011 she was appointed a Director of The National Archives.

Jardine published more than 50 scholarly articles in peer-reviewed journals and books, and 17 full-length books, both for an academic and for a general readership, a number of them in co-authorship with others (including Professor Anthony Grafton, Professor Alan Stewart and Professor Julia Swindells).

She was the author of many books, both scholarly and general, including The Curious Life of Robert Hooke: The Man Who Measured London, Ingenious Pursuits: Building the Scientific Revolution and biographies of Robert Hooke, and Sir Christopher Wren (On a Grander Scale: the Outstanding Career of Sir Christopher Wren). Her 2008 book Going Dutch, on Anglo-Dutch reciprocal influence in the 17th century, won the 2009 Cundill International Prize in History, the world's premier history book prize worth $75,000.

Jardine wrote and reviewed widely for the media, and presented and appeared regularly on arts, history and current affairs programmes for TV and radio. She was a regular writer and presenter of A Point of View on BBC Radio 4; a book of the first two series of her talks was published by Preface Publishing in March 2008 and a second in 2009. She judged the Novel category of the 1996 Whitbread Book Awards, the 1999 Guardian First Book Award, the 2000 Orwell Prize and was Chair of Judges for the 1997 Orange Prize for Fiction and the 2002 Man Booker Prize.

During the first semester of the 2008–2009 academic year, Jardine was Distinguished Visiting Professor at the Netherlands Institute for Advanced Study in the Humanities and Social Sciences, jointly sponsored by NIAS and the Royal Library in The Hague.

In 2009–2010, she was a Scaliger Visiting Fellow at the University of Leiden in the Netherlands, and held the Sarton Chair and received the Sarton Medal at Ghent University in Belgium. She sat for several years on the Apeldoorn British Dutch Conference Steering Board, and was a member of the Recommendation Committee Stichting Huygens Tentoonstelling Foundation, set up to oversee the Constantijn and Christian Huygens Exhibition in the Grote Kerk in The Hague in 2013.

In June 2015, she was the guest on BBC Radio 4's Desert Island Discs. Her musical choices included Why by Annie Lennox, A Hard Rain's a-Gonna Fall by Bob Dylan, and Once in a Lifetime by Talking Heads. Her book choice was the full 12 volumes of P.S. Allen's Latin Letters of Erasmus of Rotterdam.

On 26 January 2011, Jardine appeared in a BBC documentary investigating her father's life and the history of science in the 20th century.

She was known for her cross-disciplinary approach to intellectual history and has been called "the pre-eminent historian of the scientific method."

== Awards and honours ==
Jardine was president of the Antiquarian Horological Society, a learned society focused on matters relating to the art and history of time measurement.

Jardine was a former chairman of the governing body at Westminster City School for Boys in London (which her younger son attended), and a former chair of the Curriculum Committee on the governing body of St Marylebone Church of England School for Girls also in London.

In 2012, she was awarded the President's Medal by the British Academy.

She was elected an Honorary Fellow of the Royal Society (FRS) in 2015. Her certificate of election reads:

Lisa Jardine, CBE is director of the Centre for Interdisciplinary Research in the Humanities at UCL. Previously she spent 23 years at Queen Mary, University of London, serving as head of the English department, dean of the faculty of arts, and as Centenary Professor of Renaissance Studies. In her earlier career, after a degree in mathematics and English and a PhD on Francis Bacon, she taught at the Warburg Institute, Cornell University and then for 12 years at Cambridge.

A prolific and distinguished historian, with a special interest in the history of science, she impacted public life through her broadcasts and general writings, and her service on many public bodies. Among her 20 books, several of which have won major awards, are works on Bacon, Erasmus, Wren and Hooke. She has advised the Society on its archives, and, during a period of formal secondment to the Society, she edited the on-line 'Hooke Folio', published in 2007; she gave the Wilkins Lecture in 2003. She is in great demand as a lecturer, and has given Tanner Lectures in both Cambridge and Yale. She has received numerous honorary doctorates and fellowships; in 2012 she received the British Academy President's Medal.

She has served on the Arts and Humanities Research Council and as Trustee of the V and A Museum. In 2008 she was appointed chair of the Human Fertilisation and Embryology Authority (HFEA). She is the 2012/13 President of the British Science Association—a signal honour for a historian—and continues as a frequent broadcaster, noted for her 'Points of View' on Radio 4 and most recently for her 'Seven ages of science' series.

For nearly four decades, Lisa Jardine has combined high-level scholarship with extensive outreach, and has been extraordinarily energetic and effective in spanning the 'two cultures'. She has, in particular, been an enthusiastic advocate of the Society; election as an Honorary Fellow is recognition that she richly deserves and would deeply appreciate.

Jardine held honorary doctorates of Letters from the University of St Andrews, Sheffield Hallam University and the Open University, and an honorary doctorate of Science from the University of Aberdeen.

In November 2011, she was made an Honorary Bencher of the Honourable Society of the Middle Temple. She was awarded the Francis Bacon Award in the History of Science by the California Institute of Technology in 2012, and collected the Bacon Medal for this award at the annual History of Science Society meeting in San Diego in September 2012.

In November 2012, she received the British Academy President's Medal. In 2013–2014, she served as President of the British Science Association, which in 2012 made her an Honorary Fellow.

== Death ==
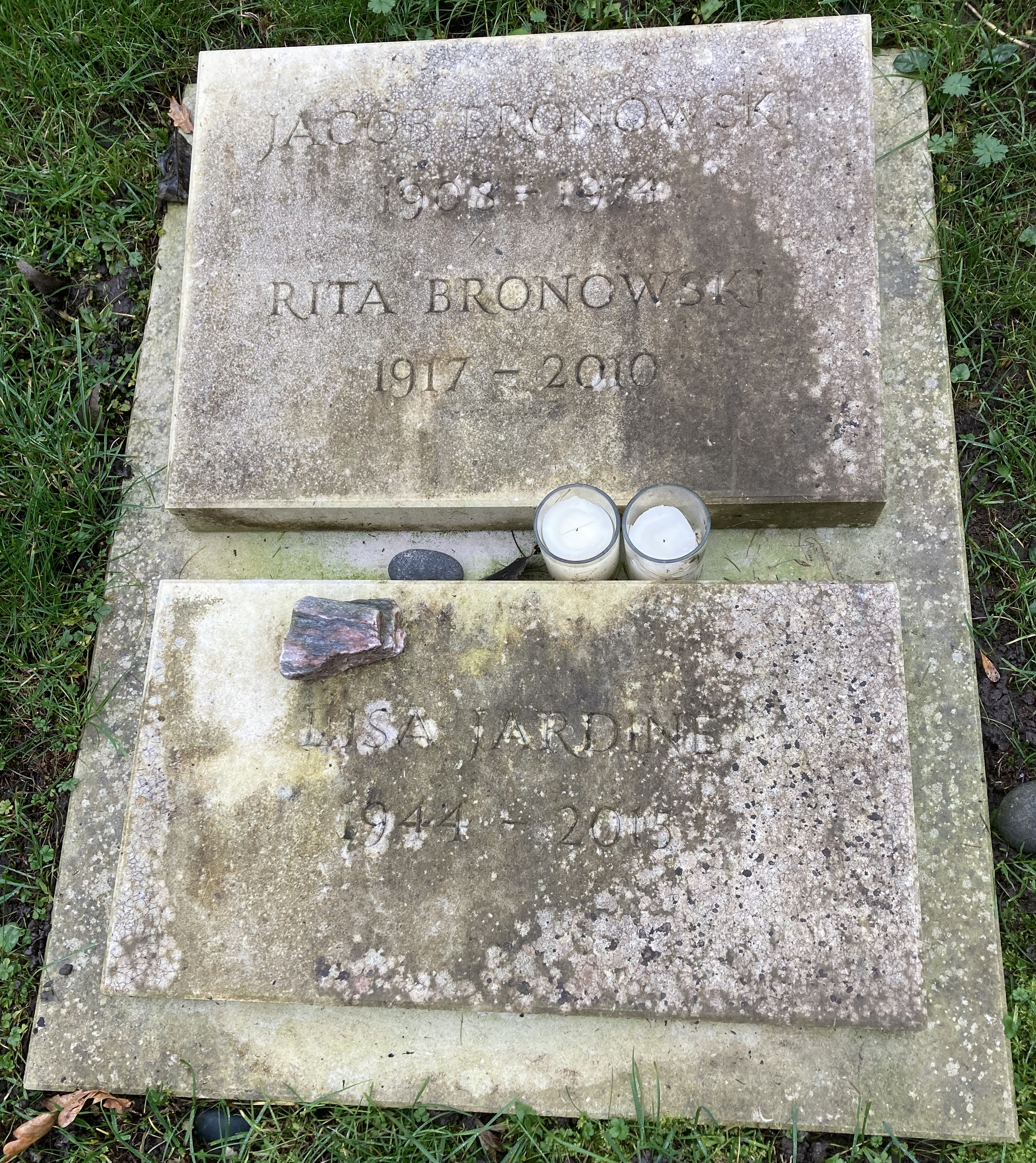
Grave of Lisa Jardine and her parents in Highgate Cemetery

Jardine died of cancer on 25 October 2015, aged 71, and her ashes were buried next to those of her parents, in the west side of Highgate Cemetery in north London. In the tributes which followed, she was remembered for her commitment to her students, and "her deep empathy for outsiders of all kinds—rebels, misfits and migrants".

In 2017, she was featured in a conference, London's Women Historians, held at the Institute of Historical Research.

== Publications ==
- Francis Bacon: Discovery and the Art of Discourse (1974)
- Still Harping on Daughters: Women and Drama in the Age of Shakespeare (1983)
- From Humanism to the Humanities: Education and the Liberal Arts in Fifteenth- and Sixteenth-century Europe, with Anthony Grafton (1986)
- What's Left?: Women in Culture and the Labour Movement, with Julia Swindells (1990)
- Erasmus, Man of Letters: The Construction of Charisma in Print (1993)
- Reading Shakespeare Historically (1996)
- Worldly Goods: A New History of the Renaissance (1996)
- Erasmus: The Education of a Christian Prince with the Panegyric for Archduke Philip of Austria, editor (1997) (Cambridge Texts in the History of Political Thought)
- Hostage to Fortune: The Troubled Life of Francis Bacon, with Alan Stewart (1998)
- Ingenious Pursuits: Building the Scientific Revolution (1999)
- Francis Bacon: The New Organon, edited with Michael Silverthorne (2000)
- Global Interests: Renaissance Art Between East and West, with Jerry Brotton (2000)
- On a Grander Scale: The Outstanding Career of Sir Christopher Wren (2002)
- For the Sake of Argument (2003)
- The Curious Life of Robert Hooke: The Man Who Measured London (2003)
- London's Leonardo: The Life and Work of Robert Hooke, with Jim Bennett, Michael Cooper and Michael Hunter (2003)
- Grayson Perry (2004)
- The Awful End of Prince William the Silent: The First Assassination of a Head of State with a Handgun (2005)
- Going Dutch: How England Plundered Holland's Glory (2008)
- Temptation in the Archives: Essays in Golden Age Dutch Culture (2015)

== Broadcasting and lectures ==
- A Point of View. BBC Radio 4 series (2008, 2010, 2011, 2014)
- My Father, the Bomb and Me. BBC Four (26 January 2011)
- Seven Ages of Science, BBC Radio 4 series (2013)
- Things I Never Knew About My Father. Conway Memorial Lecture, Conway Hall Ethical Society (26 June 2014)
