= Gunnar Broberg =

Swedish academic (1942–2022)

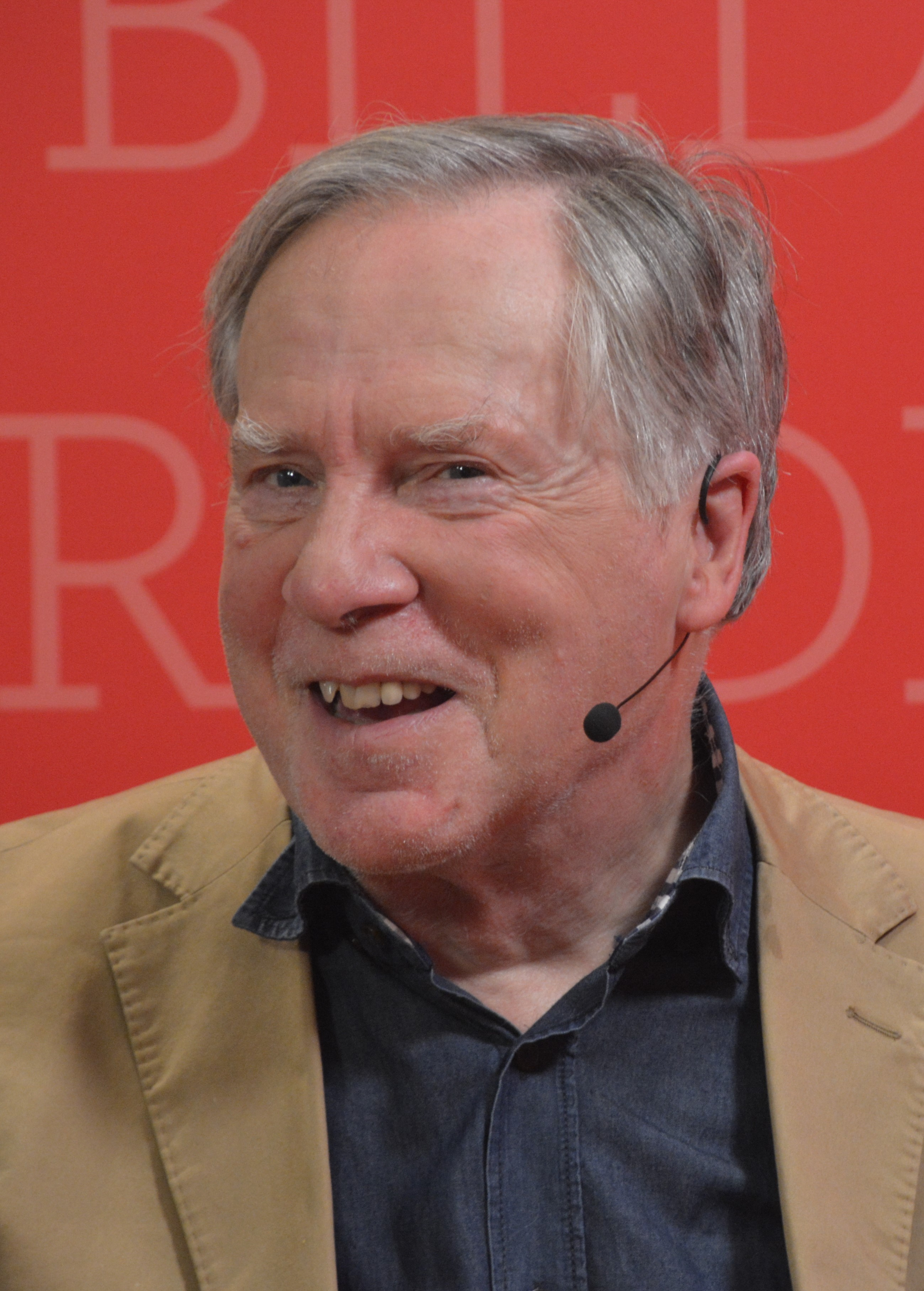
- Broberg in 2019
- Born: September 5, 1942; Flen, Sweden
- Died: 30 April 2022 (aged 79); Lund, Sweden
- Awards: Augustpriset 1992; Gleerups facklitterära pris 2004; Einar Hansens hederspris 2013; Kellgrenpriset 2020; Stora historiepriset 2020

Academic background
- Education: Uppsala University

Academic work
- Discipline: History of Science and Ideas
- Institutions: Lund University

Gunnar Broberg (5 September 1942 – 30 April 2022) was professor in History of Science and Ideas at Lund University, Sweden, appointed in 1990. Broberg has written about the compulsory sterilization activities in Sweden and extensively about the scientist Carl Linnaeus. In 2005 he was elected Chair of the Royal Humanistic Scientific Society in Lund (Kungliga Humanistiska Vetenskapssamfundet i Lund). He was the editor of the book Gyllene äpplen (Golden apples), which won the August Prize (Augustpriset) in 1992. In the Spring of 1998, Broberg was a Residential Fellow at the Swedish Collegium for Advanced Study in Uppsala, Sweden.

== English bibliography ==
- Eugenics and the Welfare State: Sterilization Policy in Denmark, Sweden, Norway, and Finland, Michigan State University Press: 1996 (with Nils Roll-Hansen).
- The Man Who Organized Nature: The Life of Linnaeus, Princeton University Press: 2023 (translated by Anna Paterson).

== Swedish bibliography ==
- Järven, filfrassen, frossaren, 1971.
- Homo sapiens L, 1975.
- Brunögd, lätt, hastig, gjorde allting promt, 1978.
- Linnéminnen i Uppsala, 1982.
- Bilden av naturen, 1983.
- Nordström och hans skola, 1983.
- Oönskade i folkhemmet, 1991 (with Mattias Tydén).
- Gyllene äpplen, 1992.
- Statlig rasforskning, 1995.
- När svensk historia blev en världsnyhet, 1999 (with Mattias Tydén).
- Kattens historia, 2004.
- Tsunamin i Lissabon, 2005.
- Carl von Linné, 2006.
- Nattens historia. Nordiskt mörker och ljus under tusen år, 2016
- Mannen som ordnade naturen: En biografi över Carl von Linné, 2019
