= Garland E. Allen =

American historian of science (1936–2023)

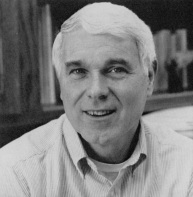
- Born: Garland Edward Allen III; February 13, 1936; Louisville, Kentucky, U.S.
- Died: February 10, 2023 (aged 86)
- Education: University of Louisville (BA 1957); Harvard University (MA 1958; PhD 1966)
- Known for: Writings on the life of Thomas Hunt Morgan; Work on the history of eugenics
- Awards: 2017 George Sarton Medal from the History of Science Society
- Scientific career
- Fields: History of science Philosophy of science
- Workplaces: Washington University in St. Louis (1967–2014)
- Thesis: Thomas Hunt Morgan: The Relation of Genetic and Evolution Theory, 1900–1925 (1966)
- Doctoral advisors: Ernst Mayr; Everett Mendelsohn

Garland Edward Allen III (February 13, 1936 – February 10, 2023) was an American historian of science and biographer at Washington University in St. Louis. His research interests lied primarily in the history of genetics, eugenics, and evolution. He was a longtime senior editor of the Journal of the History of Biology (1998–2006) and he won the 2017 Sarton Medal for lifetime achievement in the history of science.

== Early life and education ==
Garland Edward Allen III was born on February 13, 1936, in Louisville, Kentucky. He graduated from the University of Louisville in 1957 after studying English and biology. He completed his PhD in the history of science at Harvard Faculty of Arts and Sciences in 1966 under the direction of Ernst Mayr and Everett Mendelsohn after first earning a Master of Arts in Teaching focused on English at Harvard in 1958 and spending four years as a high school biology teacher at Northfield Mount Hermon School.

== Career ==
In 1967 he was hired to join the faculty of Arts and Sciences at Washington University in St. Louis, where he remained until retiring emeritus in 2014. He was recruited by Descartes scholar Thomas Hall, and he later organized a series of Thomas Hall Lectures at Washington University to invite other historians of biology to speak, beginning in 1978. He held several visiting professorships at Harvard.

He was a regular at Woods Hole, Massachusetts and became a trustee of the Marine Biological Laboratory. In 1987, he and Jane Maienschein initiated a series of history of biology seminars at the Marine Biological Laboratory that continued to run for decades.

In 1998, Allen and Maienschein succeeded Allen's former advisor Everett Mendelsohn as the second senior editors of the Journal of the History of Biology, which they continued together until passing the responsibility to Paul Farber (1944–2021) in 2006.

Allen was awarded the 2017 George Sarton Medal of the History of Science Society; he was named as "the preeminent historian of biology today" in his award commendation.

== Personal life and death ==
Allen was a Marxist in his personal life and wrote several articles on its influence on his thought. In the summer of 1965 he went to support civil rights marches from Selma, Alabama after Bloody Sunday and in November 1969 he went to Cuba as part of the Venceremos Brigade and spent about 5 months harvesting sugar cane.

He lived with his partner and husband Larry Bennet in St. Louis, where they worked together on the restoration of Lafayette Square and ran a bed and breakfast. He had two daughters.

Allen died of cancer on February 10, 2023, at the age of 86.

== Work ==
=== Thomas Hunt Morgan ===
Allen offered the fullest treatment of the life and work of Thomas Hunt Morgan, himself a Kentucky native. Allen's extensive review of Morgan presented the story of an experimentalist who staunchly avoided open political ties to science for fear of biasing the research. His discussion of the fly room, first at Columbia University, then at California Institute of Technology, suggests that the collaborative environment within which Morgan worked with his students, H.J. Muller, Alfred Sturtevant, Calvin Bridges, and Theodosius Dobzhansky played an important role in establishing Drosophila melanogaster as a model organism for genetics, and launching the careers of these titans of 20th century genetics. Allen's work contributes to the body of history chronicling the emergence of American science.

=== Eugenics ===
Allen was an international leader on the history of eugenics. His work suggests that eugenics movements were not merely localized to Germany, Britain and America, but rather that eugenics constituted an international ideological shift from Social Darwinism, whereby nature would weed out people with poor heredity, to an ideology where humanity must control its own genetic stock. He suggested that with the unveiling of the human genome, we should be cautious of a new wave of the eugenics movement.

== Selected publications ==
- Matter, Energy, and Life (4 Editions)
- Life Sciences in the 20th Century (1975)
- Thomas Hunt Morgan: The Man and His Science (1978)
- Biology: Scientific Process and Social Issues (2002)

== Accolades ==
- 2011: Fellow of American Association for the Advancement of Science
- Trustee and chairman of the history committee at the Marine Biological Laboratory
- President of the International Society for the History, Philosophy, and Social Studies of Biology
- 2017: George Sarton Medal
