= Everett Mendelsohn =

American historian of science (1931–2023)

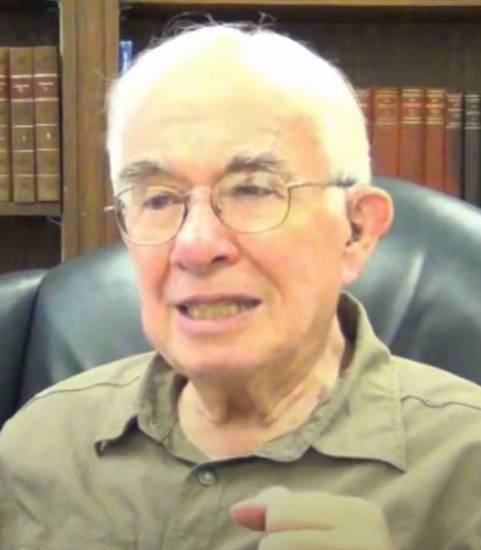
- Mendelsohn in 2013
- Born: Everett Irwin Mendelsohn; October 28, 1931; Yonkers, New York, U.S.
- Died: June 6, 2023 (aged 91); Cambridge, Massachusetts, U.S.
- Education: Antioch College; Harvard University
- Spouses: Mary Maule Leeds (m. 1954; div. 1974) Mary Baughman Anderson (m. 1974)
- Scientific career
- Fields: History of science
- Workplaces: Harvard University
- Thesis: The development of the theory of animal heat (1960)
- Doctoral students: Garland E. Allen; Ullica Segerstråle

Everett Irwin Mendelsohn (October 28, 1931 – June 6, 2023) was an American historian of science, particularly active in the history of biology. He was Professor Emeritus of the History of Science at Harvard University, where he was a Junior Fellow and then a faculty member from 1960 until his retirement in 2007. He was the founder of and long-time editor-in-chief of the Journal of the History of Biology.

== Early life and education ==
Everett Irwin Mendelsohn was born on October 28, 1931, in New York City. He grew up in the Bronx. His father worked for a candy importation company. His mother was a school secretary.

In 1949, he graduated from Brooklyn Technical High School. He then studied biology and history at Antioch College, graduating with a BS in 1953. He then went to graduate school in biology at Harvard as a Junior Fellow of the Harvard Society of Fellows. In 1960, he received a PhD in the history of science.

== Career ==
Mendelsohn was a co-founder of the American Association for the Advancement of Science's Committee on Science, Arms Control, and National Security and of the American Academy of Arts and Sciences' Committee on International Security Studies. A self-described pacifist, he was active in attempting to negotiate peace in the Middle East both as the chair of the American Academy of Arts and Sciences' Committee on Middle East Studies and through his work with the American Friends Service Committee. Mendelsohn had been elected a fellow of the American Association for the Advancement of Science in 1962.

In 1968, Mendelsohn founded the Journal of the History of Biology and he served as its editor-in-chief for 31 years thereafter. He was elected as a member of the American Academy of Arts and Sciences in 1970. He received the Gregor Mendel Medal from the Czechoslovak Academy of Sciences in 1991 and the Phi Beta Kappa Teaching Prize in 1996. In the Spring of 1994, Mendelsohn was a Fellow at the Swedish Collegium for Advanced Study in Uppsala, Sweden. In 1998, the Harvard Graduate Council honored his work mentoring students by establishing the Everett Mendelsohn Excellence in Mentoring Award, which is given annually to academics who are judged to have gone above and beyond in mentoring graduate students at Harvard.

In 2007, when Mendelsohn announced his impending retirement, his Harvard colleague Anne Harrington described him as "one of the founders of the social history of science." In 2017, the Journal of the History of Biology established the Everett Mendelsohn Prize in his honor.

== Personal life and death ==
In 1954, Mendelsohn married Mary Maule Leeds. Together they had three children. The marriage ended in divorce. In 1974, he married Mary B. Anderson, an economist and author.

Mendelsohn died after a stroke in Cambridge, Massachusetts, on June 6, 2023, at the age of 91.

== Selected works ==
- 1964: Heat and Life: the development of the theory of Animal Heat
- 1976: (with Marjorie Grene, editors) Topics in the Philosophy of Biology ISBN 902770595X
- 1977: (with Peter Weingart and Richard Whitley) The Social Production of Scientific Knowledge ISBN 9027707758
- 1984: (as editor) Transformation and Tradition in the Sciences: Essays in honor of I. Bernard Cohen. Cambridge: Cambridge University Press ISBN 0521267242
- 1988: (with Peter Weingart and Merritt Roe Smith, editors) Science, Technology and the Military ISBN 9027727805 (volume 1) ISBN 902772783X (volume 2)
- 1995: (with Sabin Maasen and Peter Weingart) Biology as Society, Society as Biology: Metaphors ISBN 0792331745
