= Nicolas Rasmussen =

French born American historian, researcher, and professor

- Born: February 1962; Paris, France
- Citizenship: United States, Australia
- Education: BA (1983), MA (1986), M.Phil. (1987), PhD, (1992), MPH (2007)
- Alma mater: University of Chicago; University of Cambridge; Stanford University; University of Sydney
- Scientific career
- Fields: History and Philosophy of Science, History of Medicine
- Workplaces: University of Sydney (1994—1997); University of New South Wales (1998—)
- Theses: The Genealogy of Inheritance: 19th Century Questions and Theories of Generation (1987); Studies on the Determination of Organ Pattern and Organ Identity in Flower Development (1992)
- Doctoral advisor: Paul B. Green
- Other academic advisors: Nick Jardine, Tim Lenoir, Lucia B. Rothman-Denes, William C. Wimsatt
- Website: http://www.nicolasrasmussen.com

Nicolas "Nic" Rasmussen FAHA (born 1962) is a historian of modern life sciences, and a professor in the School of Humanities and Languages at the University of New South Wales. With major interests in the history of amphetamines, the history of drug abuse, and the history of clinical trials, he has higher degrees in history and philosophy of science, developmental biology, and public health.

== Early life ==
Nicolas Rasmussen was born in Paris in 1962 to American parents, computer scientist Norman L. Rasmussen (1928—2003), later director of IBM's Cambridge Scientific Center and an important contributor to the development of time-sharing operating systems; and Laura Sootin Rasmussen (1933—), later an organiser and officer of the National Organization for Women in New England. He attended the Roxbury Latin School near Boston, Massachusetts.

== Education ==
Having worked in biology research labs since his early teens, Rasmussen's undergraduate exposure to art history and theory spurred an interest in history and philosophy of science. He enrolled in a PhD program in Philosophy at the University of Chicago working with William Wimsatt for two years. After receiving a master's degree, he studied the history of biology with Nick Jardine in the M.Phil. program in History and Philosophy of Science at Cambridge University. In 1987 he took up a PhD scholarship in Biological Sciences at Stanford University and, while pursuing doctoral research in plant developmental biology under Paul B. Green, he continued working in history of science with Tim Lenoir. In 2007, to allow him to become more involved in health policy scholarship, he took a master's degree in Public Health at University of Sydney Medical School.

== Career ==
After postdoctoral training in history of science at Stanford and Harvard and short stints teaching in the latter field at Princeton and UCLA, he taught the history and philosophy of science at Sydney University (1994—1997) and then at the University of New South Wales in Sydney, where he is now a Professor. In 2019 he was elected a fellow of the Australian Academy of the Humanities.

== Research ==
His research has dealt with the role of instrumentation in shaping scientific knowledge; the history of biotechnology, molecular biology and its cultural and intellectual history; the history of drug abuse and pharmaceuticals in the United States since 1900; and the influence of industry sponsorship on biomedical research. He is best known for his focus on the ways in which experimental methods and technology can shape research disciplines, sociologically and intellectually, and on the related role of patronage in shaping scientific fields in the mid-20th century USA. He has been principal investigator on several National Science Foundation (US) and Australian Research Council grants.

== Works ==
His first book, Picture Control: The Electron Microscope and the Transformation of Biology in America, 1940–1960 (1998), won both the Paul Bunge Prize for 1999, and the Forum for the History of Science in America's Book Prize for 2000. His second book, On Speed: The Many Lives of Amphetamine (2008), is a widely cited history of the amphetamines in medicine and American culture. His third book, Gene Jockeys: Life Science and the Rise of Biotech Enterprise (2014), was shortlisted in the "basis of medicine category" of the 2015 British Medical Association's Medical Book Awards, and was highly commended by the judging panel.

== Footnotes ==
External media

Audio
- Carla Nappi: Interview with Nicolas Rasmussen, author of Gene Jockeys: Life Science and the Rise of Biotech Enterprise, from New Books Network (30 January 2015).

Video
- Nicolas Rasmussen (2008): History of Amphetamines: (1) How Amphetamines Got Started
- Nicolas Rasmussen (2008): History of Amphetamines: (2) Amphetamines At War
- Nicolas Rasmussen (2008): History of Amphetamines: (3) Amphetamines in America
- Nicolas Rasmussen (2008): History of Amphetamines: (4) American Amphetamine Addiction
- Nicolas Rasmussen (2008): History of Amphetamines: (5) How to find More Information on the Military's Use of Amphetamine
