= Ullica Segerstråle =

American sociologist and historian

- Born: Ullica Christina Olofsdotter Segerstråle; October 10, 1945 (age 80); Finland
- Education: University of Helsinki; University of Pennsylvania; Harvard University
- Awards: Guggenheim Fellowship (2002); Illinois Institute of Technology Board of Trustees Outstanding Undergraduate Teaching Award (2017)
- Scientific career
- Fields: History of science Sociology of science
- Institutions: Illinois Institute of Technology
- Thesis: Whose Truth Shall Prevail? Moral and Scientific Interests in the Sociobiology Controversy (1983)
- Doctoral advisor: Alessandro Pizzorno; Everett Mendelsohn; Philip J. Stone

Ullica Christina Olofsdotter Segerstråle (born October 10, 1945) is a Finnish-American sociologist and historian of science who is professor of sociology at the Illinois Institute of Technology.

Segerstråle's published nonfiction books include Defenders of the Truth: The Battle for Science in the Sociobiology Debate and Beyond (2000) and Nature’s Oracle: The Life and Work of W. D. Hamilton (2013), the latter of which is the first biography of evolutionary biologist W.D. Hamilton.

== Early life and education ==
Ullica Christina Olofsdotter Segerstråle was born October 10, 1945, in Finland. She holds two M.S. degrees – one in organic chemistry and one in sociology – from the University of Helsinki, as well as an M.A. in communication from the University of Pennsylvania and a Ph.D. in sociology from Harvard University.

Her Ph.D. thesis, supervised jointly by sociologist Alessandro Pizzorno, historian of science Everett Mendelsohn and positive psychologist Philip J. Stone, described the sociobiology controversy of the 1970s that she had witnessed first-hand as a postgraduate student at Harvard, and it subsequently formed the basis of an article published in the first issue of Biology & Philosophy in 1986. The thesis was welcomed by E.O. Wilson and dismissed by his opponent Richard Lewontin. In 1985, Wilson's copy of the thesis was allegedly sought after by W.D. Hamilton to prepare Richard Dawkins's defence against the neurobiologist Steven Rose's libel lawsuit over Dawkins's review of Not in Our Genes, and Dawkins consulted Segerstråle himself on perceptions of sociobiology.

== Recognition ==
A Guggenheim Fellow in 2002, she was elected a member of the European Academy of Sciences and Arts in 2012. She was elected member of the Finnish Society of Sciences and Letters in 2003 and a fellow of the World Academy of Art and Science.

== Books ==
- Segerstråle, Ullica, ed. (2000). Beyond the Science Wars: The Missing Discourse about Science and Society. SUNY Press.
- Segerstråle, Ullica (2000). Defenders of the Truth: The Battle for Science in the Sociobiology Debate and Beyond. Oxford University Press.
- Segerstråle, Ullica (2013). Nature's Oracle: The Life and Work of W. D. Hamilton. Oxford University Press. ISBN 978-0-19-860727-4.
