= Big Spring Independent School District =

School district in Texas

Coordinates: 32°14′46″N 101°27′54″W

Location
- Big Spring, Texas ESC Region 18 USA

District information
- Type: Independent school district
- Grades: Pre-K through 12
- Superintendent: Jay McWilliams
- Schools: 9 (2019-2020)
- NCES District ID: 4810200

Students and staff
- Students: 3,929 (2010-11)
- Teachers: 262.36 (2009-10) (on full-time equivalent (FTE) basis)
- Student–teacher ratio: 14.80 (2009-10)
- Athletic conference: UIL Class 4A-Division 1
- District mascot: Steers
- Colors: Black, Vegas Gold

Other information
- Website: Big Spring ISD

Big Spring Independent School District is a public school district based in Big Spring, Texas (USA).

== Academic achievement ==
In 2011, the school district was rated "academically unacceptable" by the Texas Education Agency.

In 2014, the school district was rated "Improvement Required" by the Texas Education Agency.

In 2015, the school district was rated "Accredited-Probation" by the Texas Education Agency, which means that the district exhibits deficiencies in performance that, if not addressed, will lead to revocation of the district's accreditation status.

In 2025, The school district was rated a C by the Texas Education Agency.

In 2026, The school district was rated a B by the Texas Education Agency.

== Schools ==
- Big Spring High School (Grades 9-12)
- Anderson Accelerated High School (Grades 9-12)
- Big Spring Junior High (Grades 7-8)
- Big Spring Intermediate (Grades 5-6)
- Kentwood Early Childhood Center (PK)
- Marcy Elementary (Grades K-2)
- Moss Elementary (Grades K-2)
- Washington Elementary (Grade 3)

== See also ==
- List of school districts in Texas
