= Ryan Tannehill =

American football player (born 1988)

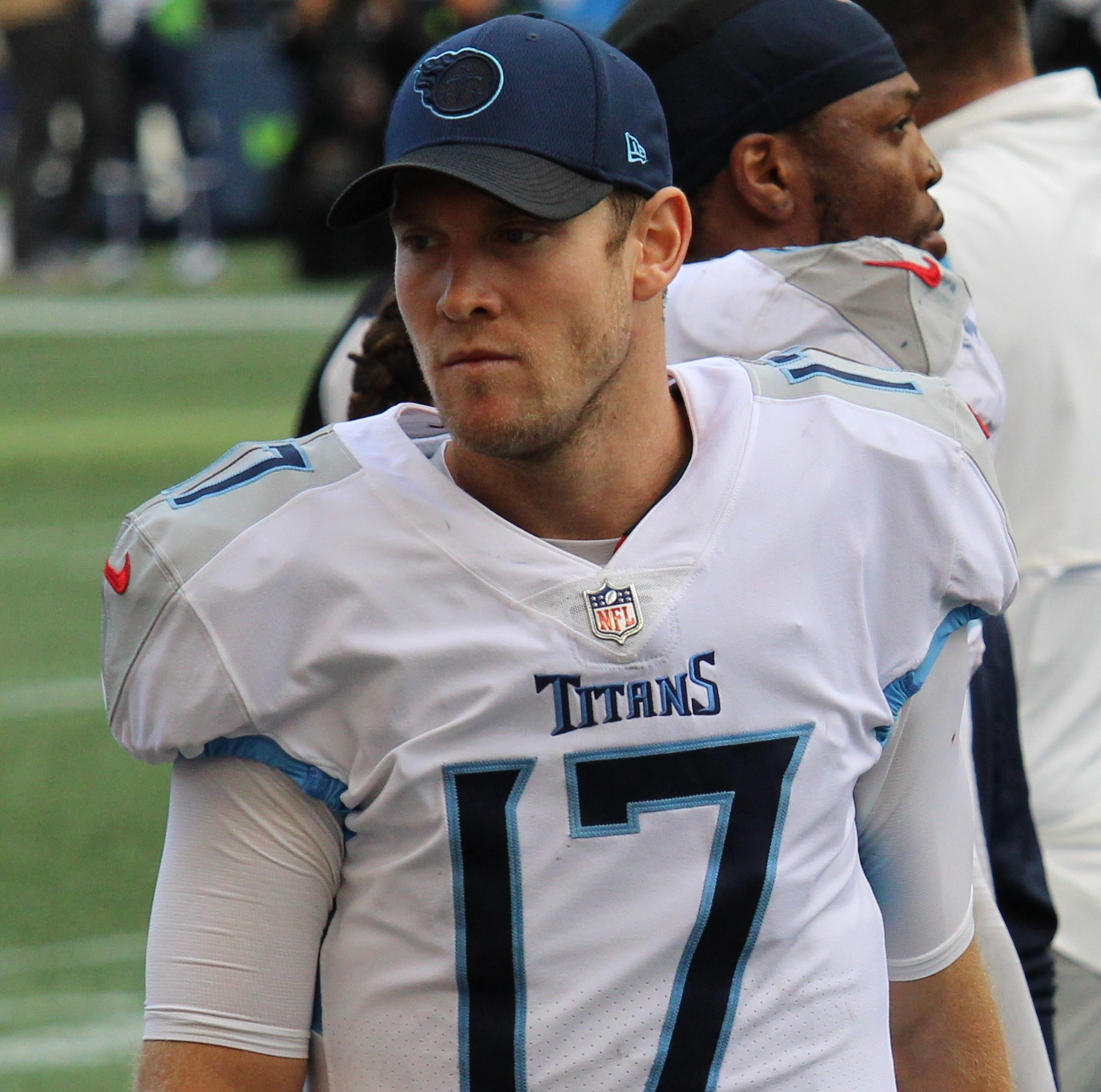
- Tannehill with the Tennessee Titans in 2021

No. 17
- Position: Quarterback

Personal information
- Born: July 27, 1988 (age 38); Lubbock, Texas, U.S.
- Listed height: 6 ft 4 in (1.93 m)
- Listed weight: 217 lb (98 kg)

Career information
- High school: Big Spring (Big Spring, Texas)
- College: Texas A&M (2007–2011)
- NFL draft: 2012: 1st round, 8th overall pick

Career history
- Miami Dolphins (2012–2018); Tennessee Titans (2019–2023)

Awards and highlights
- Pro Bowl (2019); NFL Comeback Player of the Year (2019)

Career NFL statistics
- Passing attempts: 4,764
- Passing completions: 3,063
- Completion percentage: 64.3%
- TD–INT: 216–115
- Passing yards: 34,881
- Passer rating: 91.2
- Rushing yards: 2,103
- Rushing touchdowns: 27
- Stats at Pro Football Reference

Ryan Timothy Tannehill III (born July 27, 1988) is an American former professional football quarterback who played in the National Football League (NFL) for 12 seasons with the Miami Dolphins and Tennessee Titans. He played college football for the Texas A&M Aggies and was selected eighth overall by the Dolphins in the 2012 NFL draft.

In his first seven seasons, Tannehill served as the Dolphins' primary starter. He was traded to the Titans in 2019, becoming the starter midway through the season and leading the team to the AFC Championship Game. Tannehill was named NFL Comeback Player of the Year and received Pro Bowl honors. During his next two seasons, Tannehill helped the Titans clinch consecutive division titles. His final two years were marked by injuries, leading to his retirement after the 2023 season.

== Early life ==
Tannehill was born in Lubbock, Texas, and grew up in nearby Big Spring. He attended Big Spring High School, where he played football and basketball, and ran on the track and field team. Tannehill played 10 games as a defensive back as a sophomore. As a junior, he passed for 2,510 yards and rushed for 922 at quarterback. Tannehill took his team to the playoffs as a senior, passing for 1,258 yards and rushing for another 617. He had to miss two games due to a separated shoulder in the second game of his senior year. Tannehill also recorded three receptions for 62 yards and compiled a 39.2 punt average with a long of 84 yards as a senior. He earned second-team District 4-4A honors for both his junior and senior seasons. Tannehill left high school a three-star recruit according to Rivals.com.

In track and field, Tannehill competed in hurdling and jumping events. At the 2006 District 4-4A championships, he placed third in the 300 m hurdles (41.24 s) and earned a second-place finish in the triple jump event (13.19 m).

== College career ==
=== 2007 ===
Tannehill redshirted his first season at Texas A&M University after turning down offers from the University of Houston, TCU, Tulsa, and UTEP.

=== 2008 ===
Before Tannehill's second season, Mike Sherman took over as head coach. In summer camp, Tannehill competed against veteran quarterback Stephen McGee and redshirt sophomore Jerrod Johnson for the starting quarterback position. He finished in third place behind starter Johnson and McGee. Sherman's offense utilizes three receivers and moved Tannehill to a wide receiver position.

In his fifth game, Tannehill posted a freshman school record of 210 yards on 12 catches. He recorded six receptions for 78 yards in the Iowa State game breaking the freshman school record for receptions and receiving yards. Tannehill finished his redshirt freshman season with 844 receiving yards, which was 11 yards shy of breaking Robert Ferguson's record set in 2000. Tannehill attempted only one pass as a quarterback the whole season.

Tannehill expressed his desire to become the starting quarterback at A&M: "I still think of myself as a quarterback; I still want to be a quarterback here at A&M. Hopefully that's the way it turns out. But if things don't happen that way, and Coach thinks I can better help being a receiver, then I guess I'm okay with that."

=== 2009 ===
During the 2009 offseason, Tannehill and Jerrod Johnson competed for the starting quarterback position; Johnson won the job.

Tannehill finished the 2009 season with a team-leading 46 receptions for 609 yards and four touchdowns. About 80% of his catches for the season were for first downs or touchdowns. Tannehill picked up All-Big 12 Honorable Mention honors for his performance. Tannehill only took eight snaps as a quarterback for the entire season.

=== 2010 ===
Tannehill continued to play wide receiver during the first six games of the 2010 season. Over those six games, he made 11 receptions for 143 yards. Tannehill attempted four passes during the season opener.

Tannehill saw extensive action at quarterback during the Kansas game, splitting time with starter Jerrod Johnson. Tannehill finished completing 12-of-16 passes for 155 yards and three touchdowns. In his first career start at quarterback, Tannehill led the Aggies to a 45–27 victory over Texas Tech while setting a school record with 449 passing yards. He also made a 33-yard pooch punt, his first career kick.

Tannehill quarterbacked the Aggies to a victory over No. 11 Oklahoma, which moved the team into the top 25. He helped the team maintain a ranking in the top 25 with victories over Baylor and No. 9 Nebraska. During the Nebraska game, Tannehill punted twice since the starter was injured. He and his team defeated Texas finishing the regular season. Tannehill was recognized with All-Big 12 Honorable Mention honors.

=== 2011 ===
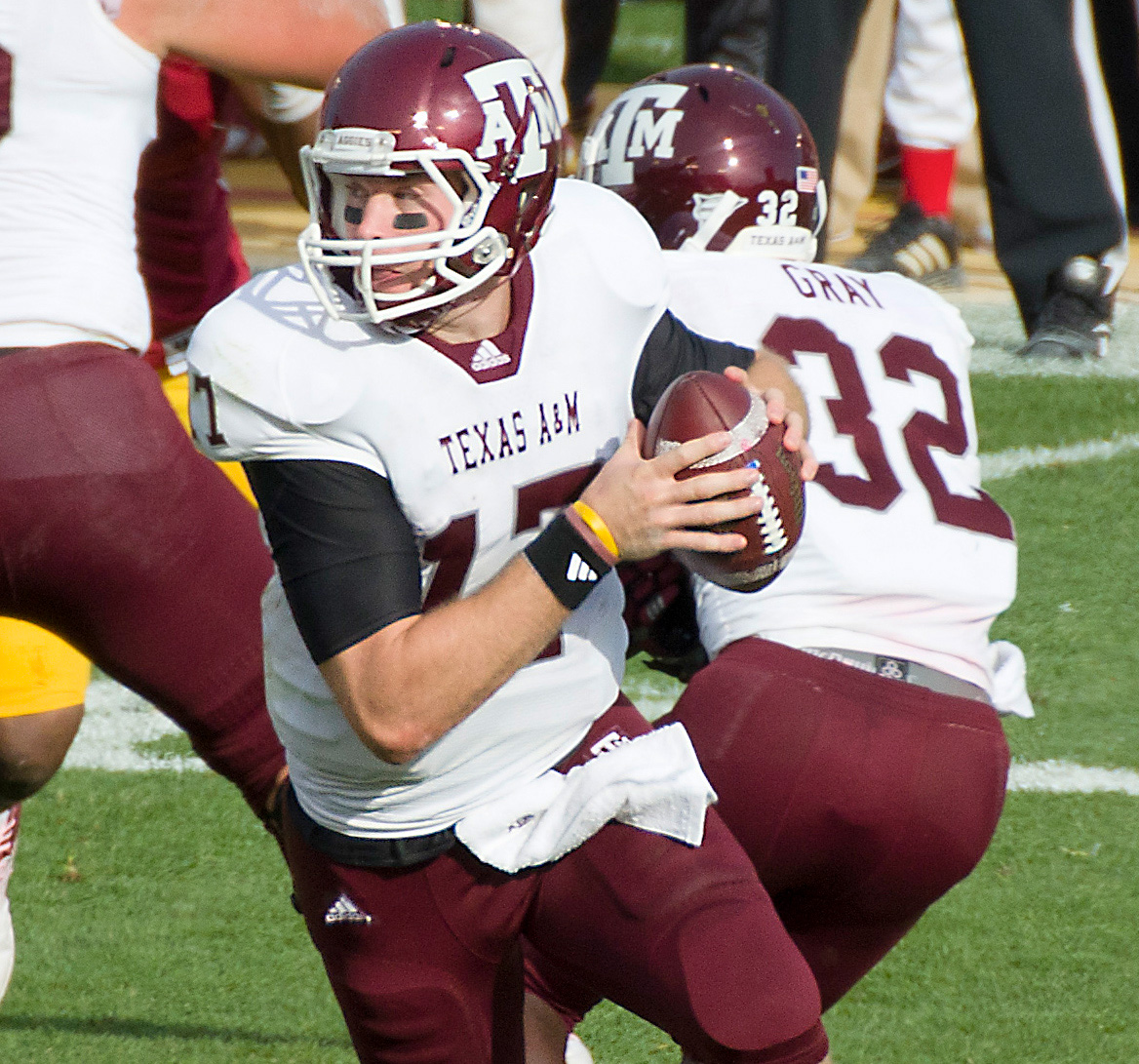
Tannehill in 2011

In 2011, Tannehill started all 13 games (including the bowl game) at quarterback for the Aggies and was the team captain. He threw for 3,744 yards and 29 touchdowns with 15 interceptions. Tannehill completed 61.6% of his passes posting a quarterback rating of 133.2 while also recording three rushing touchdowns. On Thanksgiving Day, Tannehill lost the final game of the regular season to Texas A&M's rival, the University of Texas, the last time the teams played, until the 2024–25 season.

Tannehill finished his career at Texas A&M as a quarterback with 5,450 passing yards, 42 touchdowns, and 21 interceptions.

== Professional career ==
Pre-draft measurables
Height	Weight	Arm length	Hand span	Wingspan	40-yard dash	Wonderlic
6 ft 3 7/8 in (1.93 m)	221 lb (100 kg)	32 5/8 in (0.83 m)	9 in (0.23 m)	6 ft 4 1/4 in (1.94 m)	4.58 s	34
Values from NFL Combine; 40-yard dash from Pro Day

"I have him rated as the 19th best player in the draft, which tells you I don't think he's ready to be a heavy contributor this year. I watched every throw he made on tape this year. All the out-breaking routes are phenomenal. Where he gets in trouble are the in-breaking routes where he stares the receiver down, pats the ball and throws interceptions."

— Mike Mayock, NFL Network analyst

=== Miami Dolphins ===
==== 2012 ====
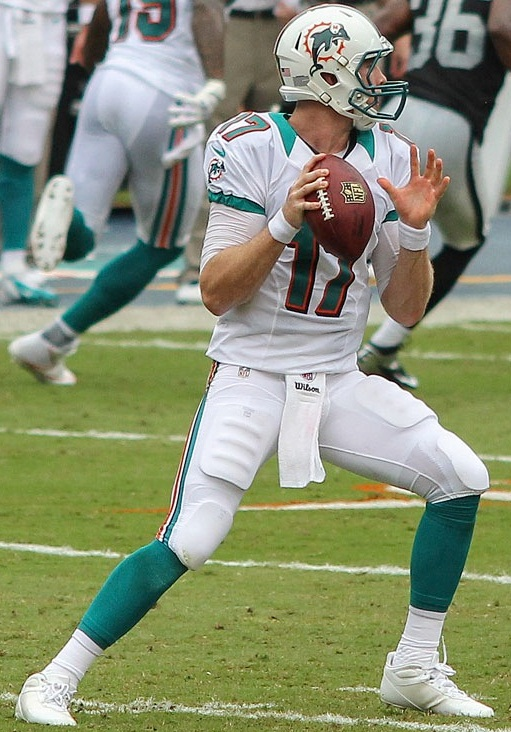
Tannehill in 2012

The Miami Dolphins selected Tannehill eighth overall in the 2012 NFL draft. He was the first quarterback selected by the Dolphins in the first round since Dan Marino went 27th overall in 1983. Tannehill became the 17th starting quarterback by the Dolphins since Marino and only the third quarterback taken in the first round in franchise history after Hall of Famers Bob Griese and Marino. On July 28, 2012, Tannehill signed a four-year rookie contract with the Dolphins worth about $12.688 million, with a fifth-year option.

Tannehill was named the starting quarterback for the season opener against the Houston Texans. He finished the 30–10 road loss with 219 passing yards and three interceptions. Two of his three interceptions were tipped at the line of scrimmage by defensive end J. J. Watt. In response to Tannehill's performance, Dolphins head coach Joe Philbin said, "We've (also) got to do a better job in (pass) protection, and at times the receivers have to protect the throw from the quarterback. So I would say, as is usually the case, there is a little bit of culpability across the board".

During Week 2, Tannehill improved dramatically in a 35–13 victory over the Oakland Raiders. He threw for 200 yards, a touchdown, and no interceptions while also rushing for 14 yards and a touchdown. Tannehill seemed to fix his tipped ball problem by having no passes batted down in that game. By the end of Week 3, Tannehill had completed less than 53% of his passes and also had only one touchdown to four interceptions. Two weeks later against the Arizona Cardinals, Tannehill threw for 431 yards, surpassing the Dolphins' single-game record for most passing yards by a rookie quarterback set by Dan Marino in 1983. Tannehill's mark was one yard shy of the NFL's single-game passing-yard record by a rookie quarterback, set by Panthers quarterback Cam Newton in 2011. Tannehill finished the 24–21 overtime road loss throwing for 431 yards, a touchdown, and two interceptions. During a Week 16 24–10 victory over the Buffalo Bills, he set a franchise record for longest run by a quarterback by rushing for 31 yards in a single play. The previous record was held by Pat White, who had a 30-yard run in 2009. Tannehill also became the fifth quarterback in team history to surpass 3,000 passing yards in a season.

Tannehill went on to set franchise rookie records for passing yards (3,294), attempts (484), and completions (282) while throwing 12 touchdowns and 13 interceptions and rushing 49 times for 211 yards and two touchdowns in 16 games and starts.

==== 2013 ====
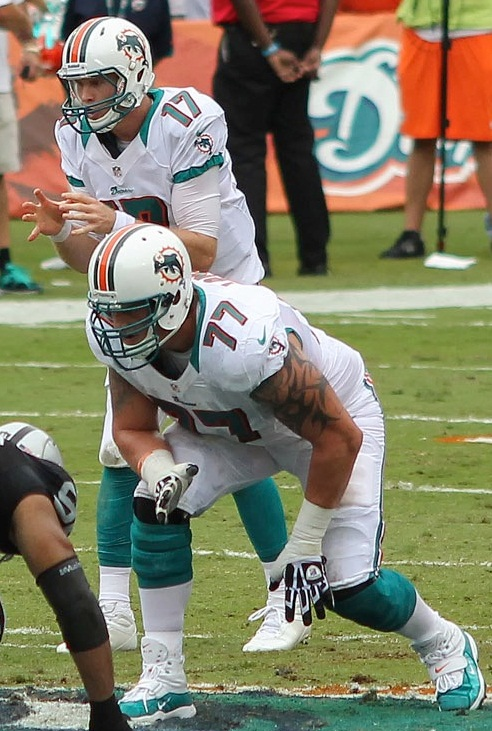
Tannehill and Jake Long in 2013

Tannehill began his second season completing 24-of-38 passes for 272 yards, a touchdown, and an interception in the season-opening 23–10 victory over the Cleveland Browns. In the next game against the Indianapolis Colts, Tannehill threw for 319 yards for a touchdown, but was sacked five times and lost a fumble during the 24–20 road victory. The following week against the Atlanta Falcons, he recorded 236 passing yards, two touchdowns, and an interception, but was sacked five times and lost a fumble in the 27–23 victory. Despite this, Tannehill led the Dolphins to a 3–0 start for the first time since 2002.

During a Week 4 38–17 road loss to the New Orleans Saints, Tannehill struggled, completing 22-of-35 passes for 249 yards and a touchdown, but also committed four team turnovers as he was intercepted thrice and lost a fumble. In the next game against the Baltimore Ravens, Tannehill had 307 passing yards and a touchdown, but was sacked six times during the 26–23 loss. Two weeks later against the Bills, he threw for 194 yards, three touchdowns, and two interceptions while losing a fumble and being sacked twice in the narrow 23–21 loss.

During a Week 8 against the New England Patriots, Tannehill had 192 passing yards, two touchdowns, and two interceptions while losing a fumble and being sacked six times in the 27–17 road loss. In the next game against the Cincinnati Bengals, Tannehill completed 20-of-28 passes for 208 yards and rushed for a one-yard touchdown despite being sacked six times due to the tottering offensive line during the narrow 22–20 overtime victory. The following week against the Tampa Bay Buccaneers, Tannehill threw for 229 yards, two touchdowns, and an interception while being sacked twice in the 22–19 road loss.

During a Week 11 20–16 victory over the San Diego Chargers, Tannehill recorded 268 passing yards, a touchdown, and an interception despite being sacked four times. Three weeks later against the Pittsburgh Steelers, he threw for 200 yards, three touchdowns, and an interception in the 34–28 road victory. In the next game against the Patriots, Tannehill had his best game of the year, completing 25-of-37 passes for 312 yards and three touchdowns during the 24–20 victory.

During Week 16 against the Bills, Tannehill followed up his best game with a lackluster performance, completing 10-of-27 passes for 82 yards and was sacked seven times in the 19–0 road loss. In the regular-season finale against the New York Jets, Tannehill had 204 passing yards, a touchdown, and three interceptions during the 20–7 loss. This was the only regular-season game where he was not sacked. The Dolphins finished with an 8–8 record and missed the playoffs.

Tannehill finished his second professional season with 3,913 passing yards, 24 touchdowns, and 17 interceptions to go along with 40 carries for 238 yards and a touchdown in 16 games and starts.

==== 2014 ====
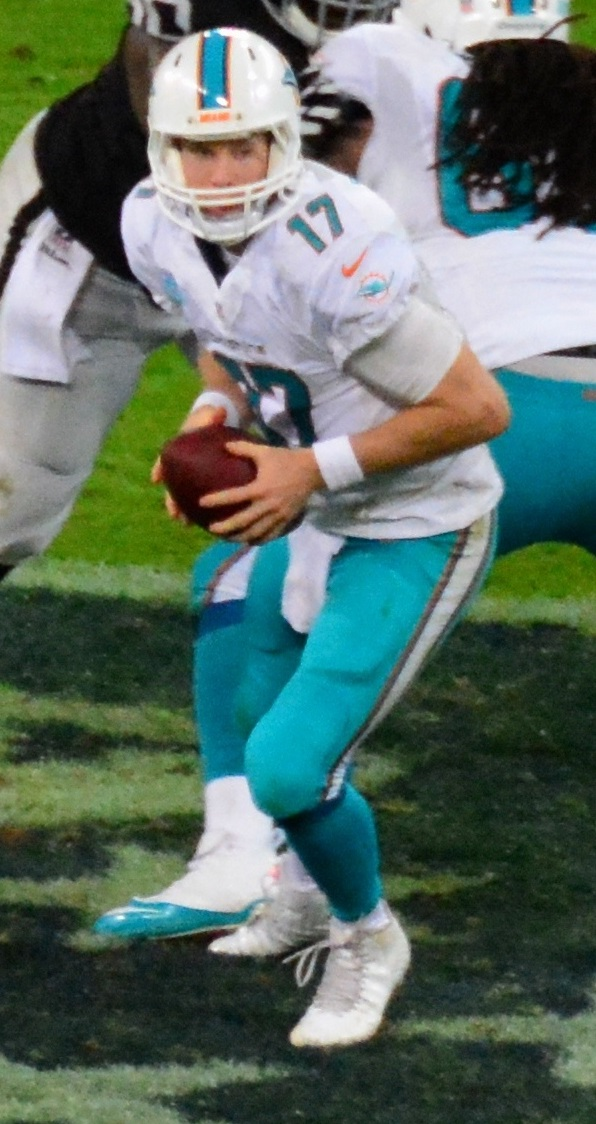
Tannehill in 2014

Mike Sherman was the Dolphins' offensive coordinator in Tannehill's first two NFL seasons, and was the head coach at Texas A&M when Tannehill played there. However, during the 2014 offseason, the Dolphins hired new offensive coordinator Bill Lazor, giving Tannehill a new playbook to learn for the first time since high school.

During the season-opening 33–20 victory over the Patriots, Tannehill threw for 178 yards, two touchdowns, and an interception. The Dolphins then went 6–7 over their next 13 games. In the penultimate game of the regular season against the Minnesota Vikings, Tannehill had a season-high 396 passing yards, four touchdowns, and an interception during the narrow 37–35 victory. The Dolphins lost the regular season finale to the Jets to finish 8–8 and missed the playoffs.

Tannehill finished the 2014 season with 4,045 passing yards, 27 touchdowns, and 12 interceptions to go along with 56 carries for 311 yards and a touchdown in 16 games and starts.

==== 2015 ====
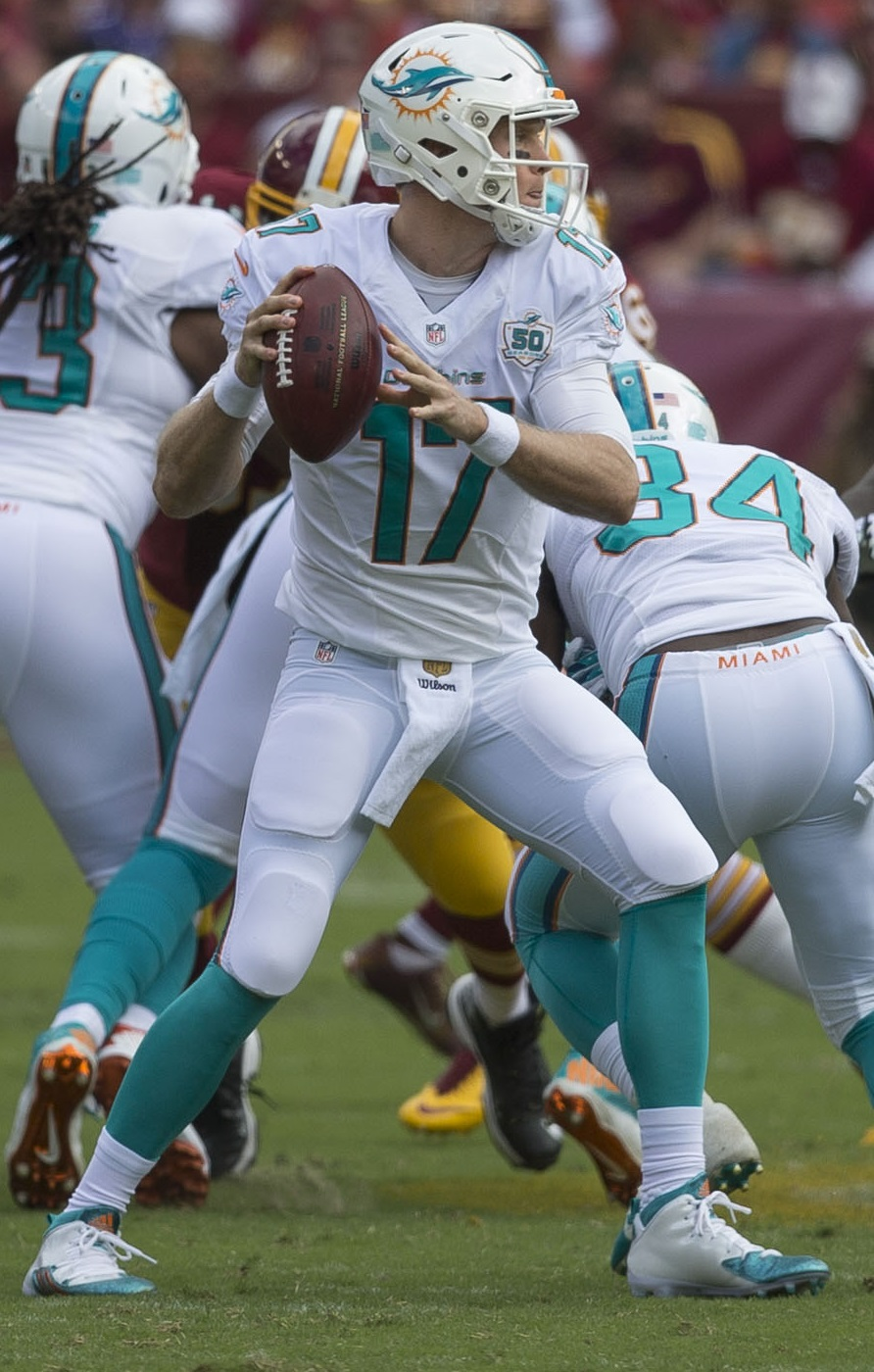
Tannehill in 2015

On May 18, 2015, Tannehill signed a six-year, $96 million contract extension with the Dolphins through the 2020 season, making him an unrestricted free agent in 2021.

During a Week 7 44–26 road victory over Texans, Tannehill became the 64th quarterback in NFL history to post a perfect 158.3 passer rating after throwing for 282 yards and four touchdowns. In that same game, he set the all-time NFL record for consecutive completed passes with 25, completing his first 18 passes of the game and the final seven of his previous game. (In 2018, Philip Rivers & Nick Foles tied Tannehill's record, but they did it in one game.) Tannehill then had a rough spell the following week on Thursday Night Football against the Patriots, throwing for 300 yards and two interceptions in the 36–7 road loss. In three successive games against the Patriots, Bills, and Philadelphia Eagles, he fumbled one ball in the end zone for an opposition safety.

During Week 13, Tannehill became the fourth quarterback in NFL history to throw for over 3,000 yards in each of his first four seasons in the league. In the next game against the New York Giants on Monday Night Football, he threw for 236 yards and a touchdown during the 31–24 loss, eliminating the Dolphins from the playoff contention for the seventh consecutive season.

Tannehill finished the 2015 season with 4,208 passing yards, 24 touchdowns, and 12 interceptions to go along with 32 carries for 141 yards and a touchdown in 16 games and starts.

==== 2016 ====
After a 1–4 start, the Dolphins won six straight games and finished the season on a 9–2 run and an overall record of 10–6. Tannehill played in 13 games, missing the last three due to an injury he suffered against the Cardinals where a low hit by Calais Campbell resulted in a partially torn anterior cruciate ligament in his left knee. Following a Week 16 victory over the Bills, the Dolphins clinched a winning record and a playoff berth for the first time since 2008.

Tannehill finished the 2016 season with a then-career-high 67.1 completion percentage for 2,995 passing yards, 19 touchdowns, and 12 interceptions to go along with 39 carries for 164 yards and a touchdown in 13 games and starts. He was inactive during the Dolphins' Wild Card Round 30–12 road loss to the Steelers.

==== 2017 ====
For treatment on his ACL, Tannehill went with stem-cell therapy and rehab over surgery. On August 3, 2017, he suffered a left leg injury when it buckled during the team's first non-contact 11-on-11 practice of season. After limping off the field, it was reported that the team feared that Tannehill tore his ACL and would require season-ending surgery. Three days later, the Dolphins signed recently retired quarterback Jay Cutler to act as Tannehill's replacement. On August 11, Tannehill agreed to have surgery to repair the torn ACL, officially keeping him out of the 2017 season. Tannehill was placed on injured reserve the following day.

==== 2018 ====
On March 1, 2018, head coach Adam Gase announced that Tannehill would continue to be the starting quarterback for the Dolphins.

During the season-opener against the Tennessee Titans, the game was delayed twice due to lightning storms. In his return from injury, Tannehill finished with 230 passing yards, two touchdowns, and two interceptions in the 27–20 victory. Two weeks later, he recorded 289 passing yards and three touchdowns for a 155.3 passer rating in a 28–20 victory over the Raiders. Tannehill was inactive for the Week 6 matchup against the Chicago Bears due to a shoulder injury. Brock Osweiler started in Tannehill's place until Week 12.

During Week 14, Tannehill was part of the Miracle in Miami against the Patriots. Trailing by five points with seven seconds left, the Dolphins had the ball at their own 31-yard line. Tannehill threw a pass over the middle that was caught by wide receiver Kenny Stills, who lateraled the ball to the right side of the field that was caught by DeVante Parker at midfield. Parker then tossed the ball to running back Kenyan Drake, who ran the ball for a 52-yard touchdown to narrowly win the game 34–33. Over the last three games of the regular season, Tannehill struggled with a total of one touchdown and three interceptions in the three losses.

Tannehill finished the 2018 season with 1,979 passing yards, 17 touchdowns, and nine interceptions to go along with 32 carries for 145 yards in 11 games and starts.

=== Tennessee Titans ===
==== 2019: Comeback Player of the Year ====
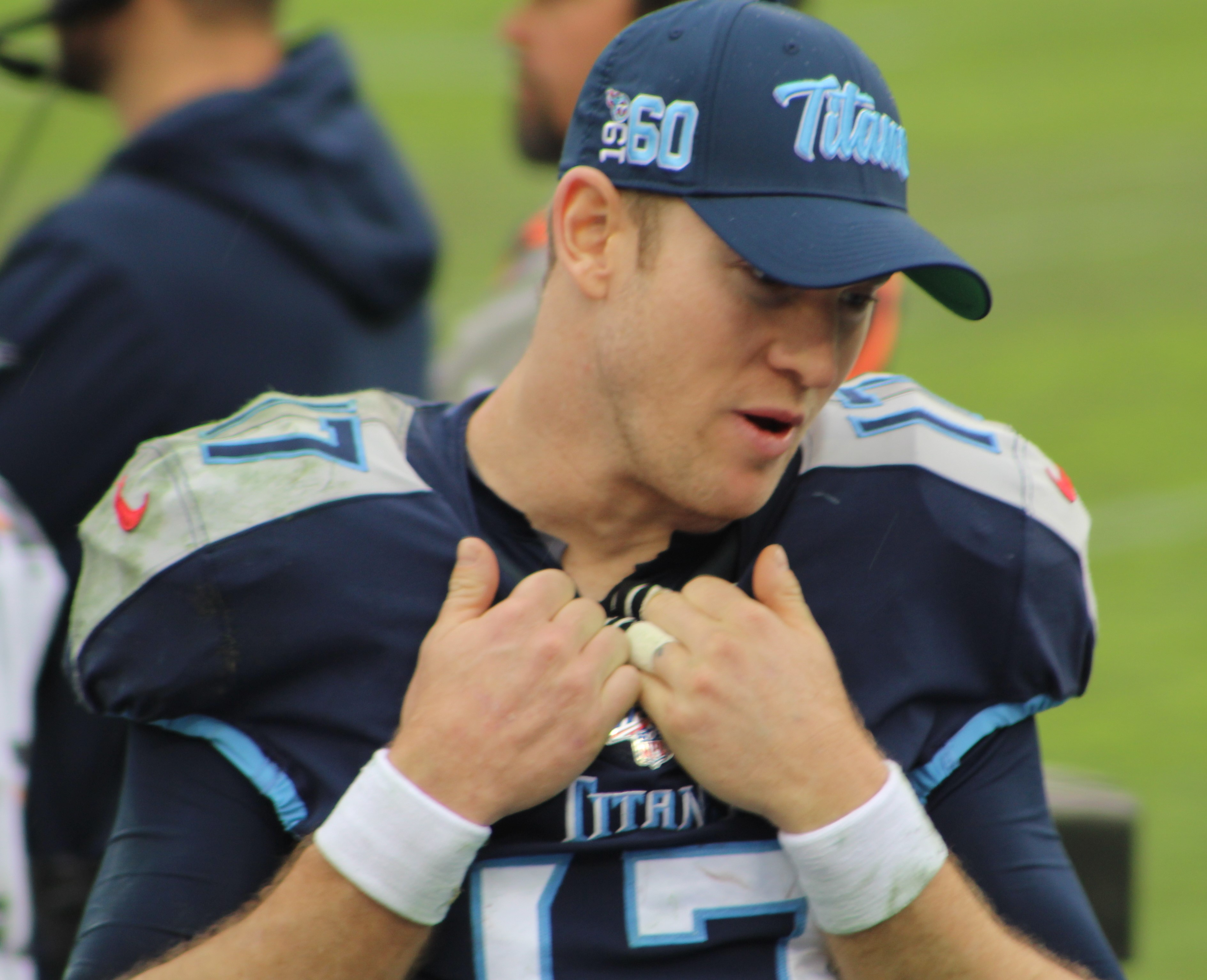
Tannehill in 2019

On March 15, 2019, the Dolphins traded Tannehill and a sixth-round selection in the 2019 NFL draft to the Titans in exchange for a fourth-round selection in the 2020 draft and a seventh-round selection in the 2019 draft. Following the trade, he signed a one-year deal worth $7 million with up to $12 million in incentives.

Tannehill made his Titans debut in the season-opener against the Cleveland Browns, taking a knee twice to close out the 43–13 road victory. During Week 6 against the Denver Broncos, Tannehill replaced Marcus Mariota at quarterback in the second half of the 16–0 shutout road loss, completing 13-of-16 passes for 144 yards and an interception. Tannehill was named as the Titans' starting quarterback for the Week 7 matchup against the Los Angeles Chargers. He finished the 23–20 victory completing 23-of-29 passes for 312 yards, two touchdowns, and an interception. In the next game against the Buccaneers, Tannehill threw for 193 yards and three touchdowns during the 27–23 victory. The following week against the Carolina Panthers, he had 331 passing yards, a touchdown, and two interceptions to go along with four carries for 38 yards and a touchdown in the 30–20 road loss.

During a Week 10 35–32 victory over the Kansas City Chiefs, Tannehill threw for 181 yards and two touchdowns while also rushing for 37 yards and a two-point conversion. Following a Week 11 bye, the Titans faced the Jacksonville Jaguars. Tannehill finished the 42–20 victory completing 14-of-18 passes for 259 yards and two touchdowns while also rushing for 40 yards and two touchdowns. In the next game against the Colts, he completed 17-of-22 passes for 182 yards and two touchdowns during the 31–17 road victory. The following week later against the Raiders, Tannehill had another great outing, completing 21-of-27 passes for 391 yards, three touchdowns, and an interception in the 42–21 road victory. He was named AFC Offensive Player of the Week for his performance.

During Week 15 against the Texans, Tannehill threw for 279 yards, two touchdowns, and an interception in the 24–21 loss. In the next game against the Saints, he recorded 272 passing yards and three touchdowns during the 38–28 loss. During the regular-season finale against the Texans, Tannehill threw for 198 yards and two touchdowns in the 35–14 road victory, taking the Titans to the playoffs as the #6-seed.

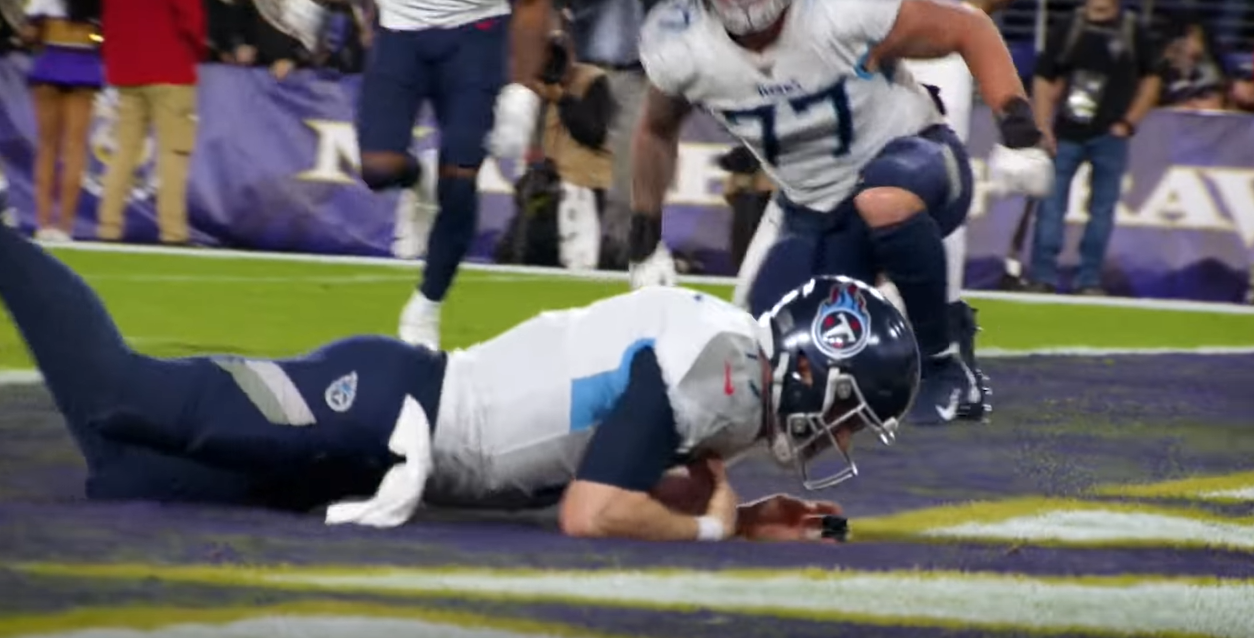
Tannehill rushing for a touchdown in the Divisional Round against the Ravens

Tannehill finished the 2019 season with 2,742 passing yards, 22 touchdowns, and six interceptions to go along with 43 carries for 185 yards and four touchdowns in 12 games and 10 starts. He also led the league and set franchise records with a 117.5 quarterback rating and 9.6 yards per attempt, while his 70.3 completion percentage also set a franchise record.

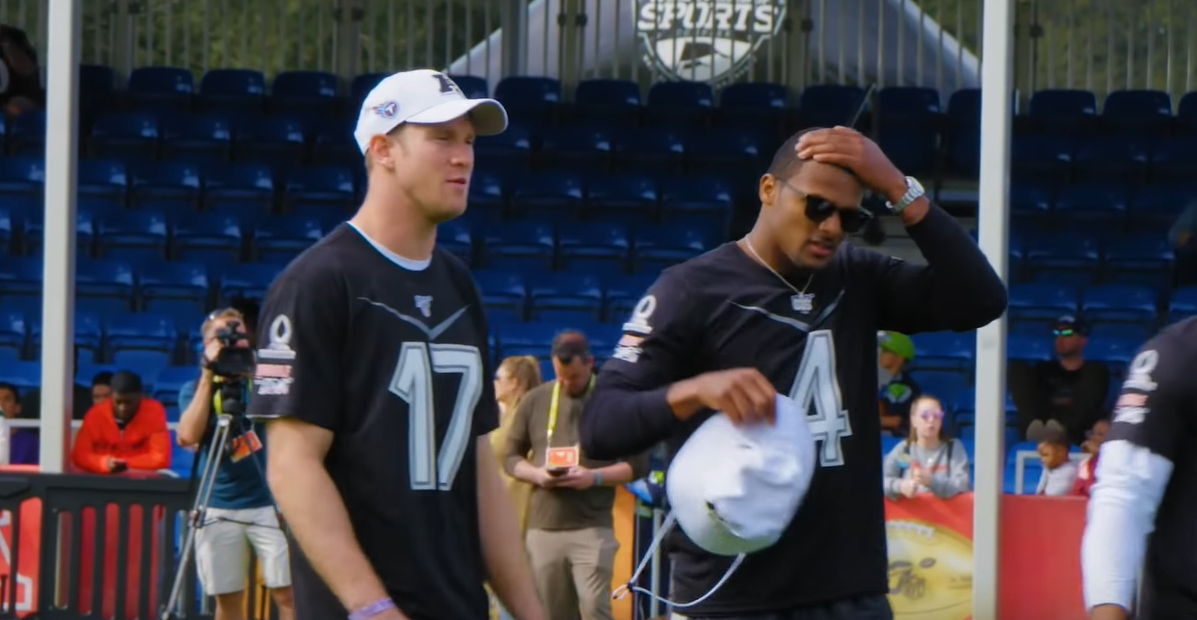
Tannehill alongside Deshaun Watson at the 2020 Pro Bowl

During the Wild Card Round against the defending Super Bowl LIII champion, the Patriots, Tannehill completed eight of 15 passes for 72 yards, a touchdown, and interception while also rushing for 11 yards during the 20–13 upset road victory. It was the fewest completions and yards by a winning postseason quarterback since Joe Flacco's four of 10 for 34 yards performance in 2010, which was also against the Patriots. In the Divisional Round against the Ravens, Tannehill completed seven of 14 passes for 88 yards and two touchdowns while also rushing for 13 yards and a touchdown as the Titans upset the heavily favored Ravens on the road 28–12. He joined Terry Bradshaw as the only player in the Super Bowl era to win consecutive playoff games with one or more touchdown passes and fewer than 100 yards passing. During the AFC Championship Game, Tannehill completed 21-of-31 passes for 209 yards and two touchdowns and rushed for 11 yards as the Titans lost to the eventual Super Bowl champion Kansas City Chiefs on the road 35–24. He was named to his first career Pro Bowl on January 20, 2020, replacing the Super Bowl-bound Patrick Mahomes. On February 1, Tannehill was named the NFL Comeback Player of the Year. He was ranked 68th by his fellow players on the NFL Top 100 Players of 2020.

==== 2020 ====
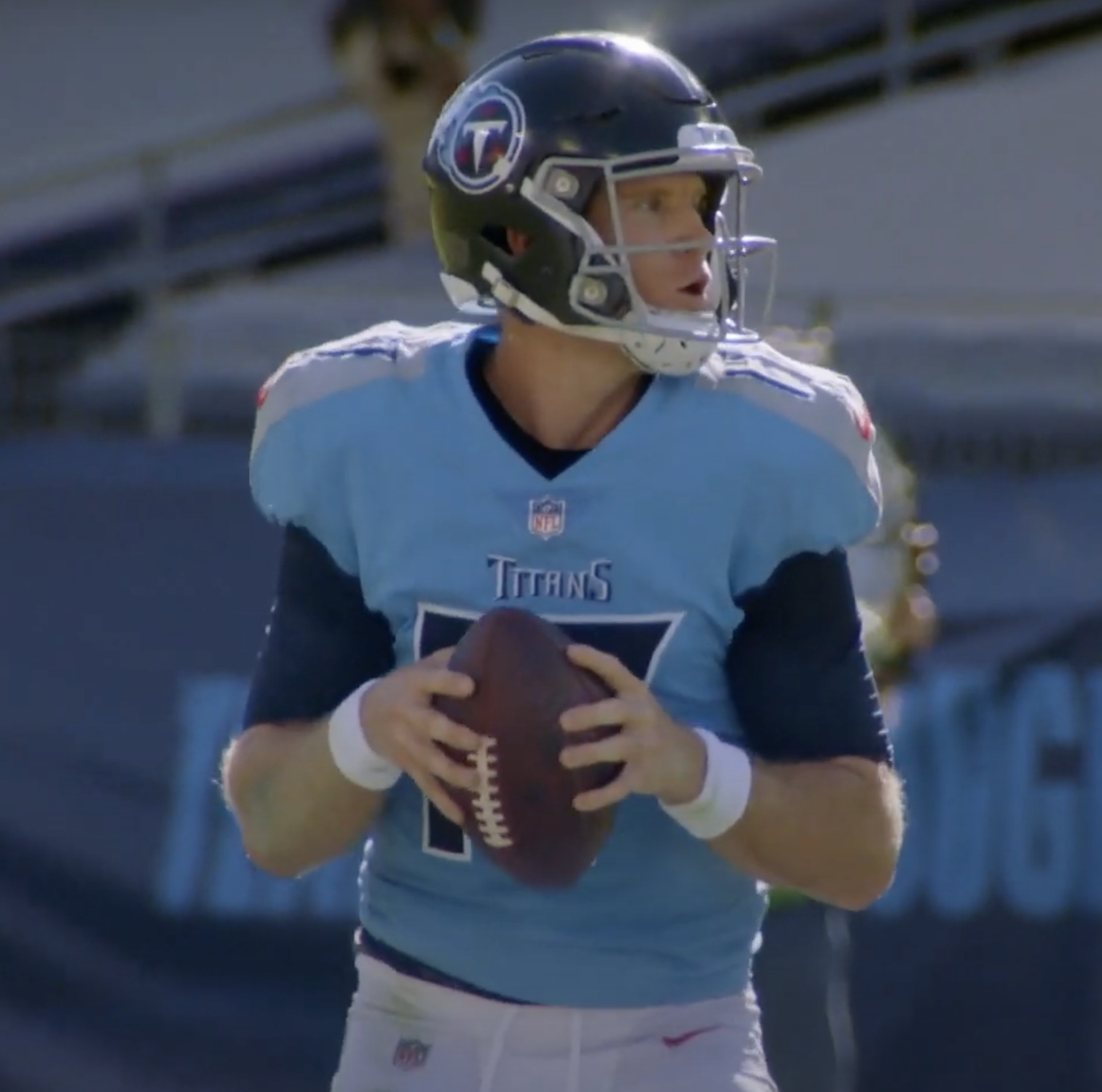
Tannehill in 2020

On March 17, 2020, Tannehill signed a four-year extension with the Titans worth $118 million, with $62 million guaranteed.

During the season-opener against the Broncos on Monday Night Football, Tannehill threw for 249 yards and two touchdowns in the narrow 16–14 road victory. In the next game against the Jaguars, he completed 18-of-24 passes for 239 yards and four touchdowns during the 33–30 victory. The following week against the Minnesota Vikings, Tannehill threw for 321 yards and an interception in the narrow 31–30 road victory.

During Week 5 against the Bills on Tuesday Night Football, Tannehill completed 21-of-28 passes for 195 yards and three touchdowns while also rushing four times for 42 yards and a touchdown in the 42–16 victory. In the next game against the Texans, he completed 30-of-41 passes for 364 yards, four touchdowns, and an interception during the 42–36 overtime victory. The following week against the Steelers, Tannehill recorded 220 passing yards and two touchdowns in the 27–24 loss.

During a Week 8 31–20 loss to the Bengals, Tannehill had 233 passing yards, two touchdowns, and an interception. In the next game against the Bears, he threw for 158 yards and two touchdowns during the 24–17 victory. Two weeks later against the Ravens, Tannehill completed 22-of-31 passes for 259 yards, two touchdowns, and an interception while also rushing four times for 35 yards and a two-point conversion in the 30–24 overtime road victory.

During Week 12 against the Colts, Tannehill threw for 221 yards and a touchdown while also rushing for three yards and a touchdown in the 45–26 road victory. In the next game against the Browns, he recorded 389 passing yards, three touchdowns, and an interception during the 41–35 loss. The following week against the Jaguars, Tannehill completed 19-of-24 passes for 212 yards and two touchdowns in the 31–10 road victory.

During a Week 15 46–25 victory over the Detroit Lions, Tannehill completed 21-of-27 passes for 273 yards and three touchdowns and rushed for 21 yards and two touchdowns. In the next game against the Green Bay Packers on Sunday Night Football, he threw for 121 yards, a touchdown, and two interceptions and rushed thrice for 55 yards and a 45-yard touchdown during the 40–14 road loss. In the regular-season finale against the Texans, Tannehill recorded 216 passing yards and a touchdown to go along with 38 rushing yards and two touchdowns during the 41–38 road victory.

Tannehill finished the 2020 season with 3,819 passing yards, a career-high 33 touchdowns, and seven interceptions to go along with 43 carries for 266 yards and a career-high seven touchdowns in 16 games and starts. The Titans finished atop the AFC South with an 11–5 record and qualified for the playoffs as the #4-seed. During the Wild Card Round against the Ravens, Tannehill threw for 165 yards, a touchdown, and an interception in the 20–13 loss. He was ranked 83rd by his fellow players on the NFL Top 100 Players of 2021.

==== 2021 ====
Tannehill began the season throwing for 212 yards, a touchdown, and an interception while also rushing for 17 yards and a touchdown in the season-opening 38–13 loss to the Cardinals. In the next game against the Seattle Seahawks, he had 347 passing yards during the 33–30 overtime road victory. The following week against the Colts, Tannehill threw for 197 yards, three touchdowns, and two interceptions in the 25–16 victory.

During a Week 6 34–31 victory over the Bills on Monday Night Football, Tannehill recorded 216 passing yards and an interception to go along with three rushing yards and a touchdown. In the next game against the Chiefs, he completed 21-of-27 passes for 270 yards, a touchdown, and an interception while also rushing twice for six yards and a touchdown during the 27–3 blowout victory. The following week against the Colts, he threw for 265 yards, three touchdowns, and two interceptions in the 34–31 overtime road victory.

During Week 9 against the Los Angeles Rams on Sunday Night Football, Tannehill had 143 passing yards, a touchdown, and an interception to go along with three rushing yards and a touchdown in the 28–16 road victory. In the next game against the Saints, he threw for 213 yards and a touchdown while also rushing for a touchdown during the narrow 23–21 victory. The following week against the Texans, Tannehill completed 35-of-52 passes for 323 yards, a touchdown, and four interceptions in the 22–13 loss.

During a Week 16 20–17 comeback victory over the San Francisco 49ers on Thursday Night Football, Tannehill recorded 209 passing yards and two touchdowns to go along with a critical 23-yard rush that put the Titans in field goal range for Randy Bullock to kick the game-winning field goal. In the next game against his former team, the Miami Dolphins, Tannehill threw for 120 yards and two touchdowns during the 34–3 blowout victory. During the regular-season finale against the Texans, he completed 23-of-32 passes for 287 yards and four touchdowns in the 28–25 road victory, clinching the #1-seed in the AFC for the Titans. Tannehill was named AFC Offensive Player of the Week for his performance against the Texans.

Tannehill finished the 2021 regular season with 3,734 passing yards, 21 touchdowns, and 14 interceptions to go along with 55 carries for 270 yards and tying a career-high seven touchdowns. He led the Titans to back-to-back AFC South titles for the first time in franchise history as well as clinching the #1-seed in the AFC for the first time since 2008. In the Divisional Round against the Bengals, Tannehill threw for 220 yards, a touchdown, and three interceptions during the 19–16 loss.

==== 2022 ====
During the narrow season-opening 21–20 loss to the Giants, Tannehill played well, recording 266 passing yards and two touchdowns. However, in the next game against the Bills on Monday Night Football, he threw for 117 yards and two interceptions before being benched for rookie Malik Willis during the third quarter of the 41–7 road loss. The following week against the Las Vegas Raiders, Tannehill completed 19-of-27 passes for 264 yards, a touchdown, and an interception while also rushing for a touchdown in the narrow 24–22 victory.

During a Week 4 24–17 road victory over the Colts, Tannehill completed 17-of-21 passes for 137 yards and two touchdowns. In the next game against the Commanders, he recorded 181 passing yards and a touchdown during the 21–17 road victory. Two weeks later against the Colts, Tannehill threw for 132 yards but suffered an ankle injury in the 19–10 victory. He missed the next two games as a result.

Tannehill returned from injury during Week 10 against the Broncos and finished the 17–10 victory with 255 passing yards and two touchdowns. In the next game against the Packers on Thursday Night Football, he completed 22-of-27 passes for 333 yards, two touchdowns, and an interception during the 27–17 road victory. Two weeks later against the Philadelphia Eagles, Tannehill threw for 141 yards and a touchdown in the 35–10 road loss.

During a Week 14 36–22 loss to the Jaguars, Tannehill had 254 passing yards, two touchdowns, and an interception. In the next game against the Chargers, he threw for 165 yards and an interception while also rushing for a touchdown, but he re-aggravated his ankle injury during the 17–14 road loss. As a result, Tannehill missed the next game against the Texans before being placed on injured reserve on December 29, 2022. Without Tannehill, the Titans finished the season with a 7–10 record and missed the playoffs.

Tannehill finished the 2022 season with 2,536 passing yards, 13 touchdowns, and six interceptions to go along with 34 carries for 98 yards and two touchdowns in 12 games and starts.

==== 2023 ====
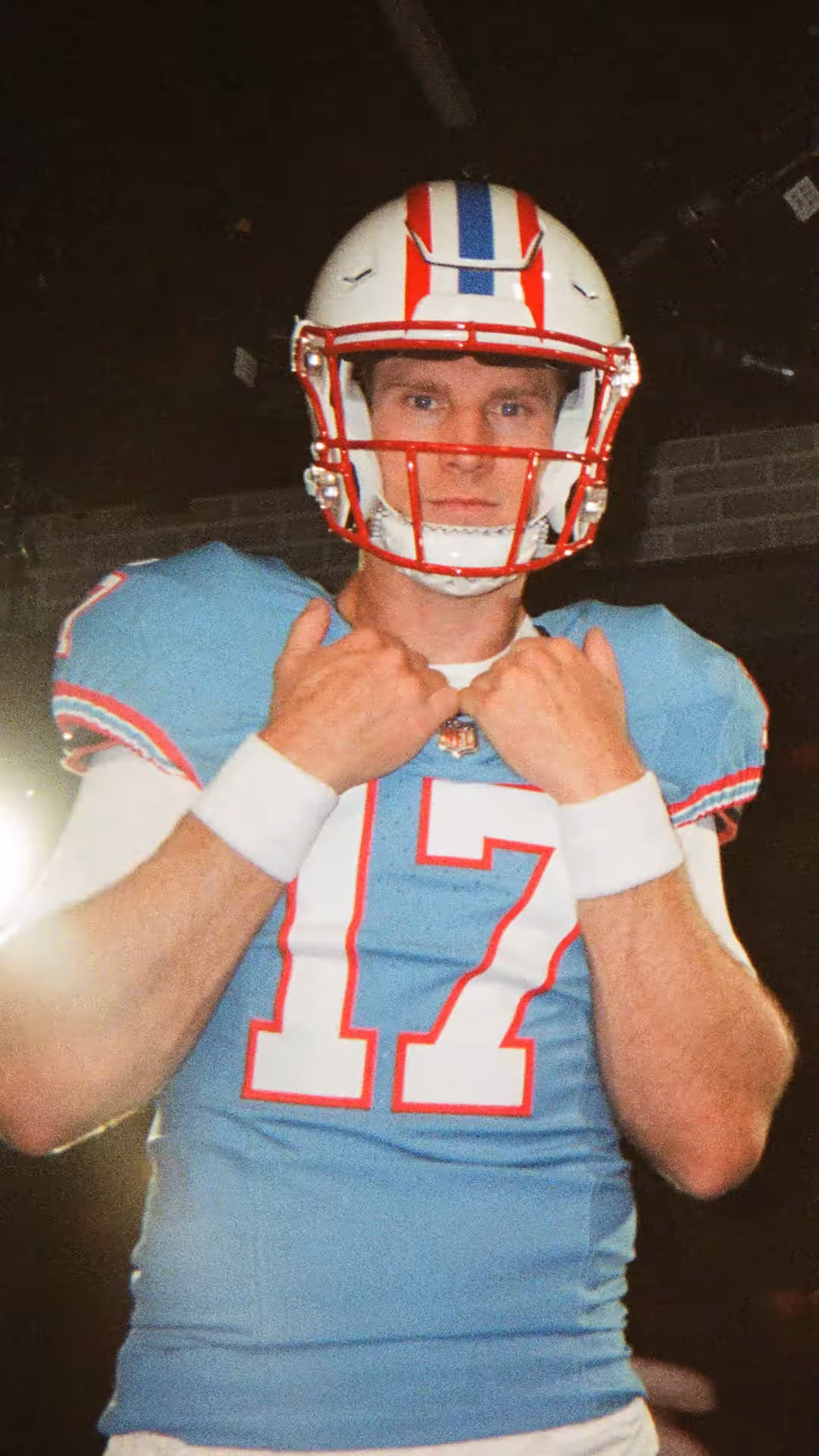
Tannehill in 2023

Tannehill returned as the starting quarterback for the Titans in 2023, despite competition from Malik Willis and rookie Will Levis.

Tannehill returned from injury in the season-opener against the Saints and finished the narrow 16–15 road loss with 198 passing yards and three interceptions. In the next game against the Chargers, he bounced back, completing 20-of-24 passes for 246 yards and a touchdown while also rushing for a 12-yard touchdown during the 27–24 overtime victory. Two weeks later against the Bengals, Tannehill completed 18-of-25 passes for 240 yards, a touchdown, and an interception in the 27–3 blowout victory.

During Week 6 against the Ravens in London, Tannehill threw for 76 yards and an interception before leaving the eventual 24–16 loss in the fourth quarter with a high ankle sprain. He missed the next two games as a result. In that span, Levis filled in as the starter and led the team to a Week 8 28–23 victory over the Falcons in his first start, but the Titans lost to the Steelers on the road 20–16 the following week.

On November 7, 2023, head coach Mike Vrabel announced that Levis would be the Titans' starting quarterback moving forward and that Tannehill would be the backup. Due to injuries to Levis, Tannehill started two of the Titans' last three games, including a Week 18 28–20 victory over the Jaguars, where he threw for 168 yards and two touchdowns to eliminate the Jaguars from the playoffs.

Tannehill finished the 2023 season with 1,616 passing yards, four touchdowns, and seven interceptions to go along with 17 carries for 74 yards and a touchdown in 10 games and eight starts.

=== Retirement ===
On November 12, 2025, Tannehill announced his retirement from the NFL.

== Career statistics ==
Legend
	Led the league
**Bold**	Career high

=== NFL ===
==== Regular season ====
Year	Team	Games			Passing									Rushing					Sacks		Fumbles	
Year	Team	GP	GS	Record	Cmp	Att	Pct	Yds	Y/A	Lng	TD	Int	Rtg	Att	Yds	Avg	Lng	TD	Sck	Yds	Fum	Lost
2012	MIA	16	16	7–9	282	484	58.3	3,294	6.8	80	12	13	76.1	49	211	4.3	31	2	35	234	9	4
2013	MIA	16	16	8–8	355	588	60.4	3,913	6.7	67	24	**17**	81.7	40	238	6.0	**48**	1	**58**	399	9	**5**
2014	MIA	16	16	8–8	**392**	**590**	66.4	4,045	6.9	50	27	12	92.8	**56**	**311**	5.6	40	1	46	337	9	2
2015	MIA	16	16	6–10	363	586	61.9	**4,208**	7.2	54	24	12	88.7	32	141	4.4	28	1	45	**420**	**10**	3
2016	MIA	13	13	8–5	261	389	67.1	2,995	7.7	74	19	12	93.5	39	164	4.2	18	1	29	216	9	3
2017	MIA	0	0	—	Did not play due to injury																	
2018	MIA	11	11	5–6	176	274	64.2	1,979	7.2	75	17	9	92.7	32	145	4.5	20	0	35	279	5	4
2019	TEN	12	10	7–3	201	286	**70.3**	2,742	**9.6**	**91**	22	6	**117.5**	43	185	4.3	25	4	31	212	6	3
2020	TEN	16	16	11–5	315	481	65.5	3,819	7.9	75	**33**	7	106.5	43	266	**6.2**	45	**7**	24	173	6	1
2021	TEN	17	17	**12–5**	357	531	67.2	3,734	7.0	57	21	14	89.6	55	270	4.9	28	**7**	47	327	**10**	4
2022	TEN	12	12	6–6	212	325	65.2	2,536	7.8	69	13	6	94.6	34	98	2.9	17	2	33	238	3	2
2023	TEN	10	8	3–5	149	230	64.8	1,616	7.0	70	4	7	78.5	17	74	4.4	23	1	32	230	4	0
Career		155	151	81–70	3,063	4,764	64.3	34,881	7.3	91	216	115	91.2	440	2,103	4.8	48	27	415	3,065	80	31

==== Postseason ====
Year	Team	Games			Passing									Rushing					Sacks		Fumbles	
Year	Team	GP	GS	Record	Cmp	Att	Pct	Yds	Y/A	Lng	TD	Int	Rtg	Att	Yds	Avg	Lng	TD	Sck	Yds	Fum	Lost
2016	MIA	0	0	—	Did not play due to injury																	
2019	TEN	3	3	**2–1**	**36**	**60**	60.0	**369**	6.2	**45**	**5**	1	**98.5**	**13**	**35**	2.7	**9**	**1**	**5**	**40**	**2**	0
2020	TEN	1	1	0–1	18	26	**69.2**	165	6.3	35	1	1	83.0	2	6	3.0	4	0	1	7	0	0
2021	TEN	1	1	0–1	15	24	62.5	220	**9.2**	41	1	**3**	66.7	3	12	**4.0**	8	0	1	7	0	0
Career		5	5	2–3	69	110	62.7	754	6.9	45	7	5	85.2	18	53	2.9	9	1	7	54	2	0

=== College ===
Season	Team	Games		Passing							Rushing				Receiving			
Season	Team	GP	GS	Cmp	Att	Pct	Yds	TD	Int	Rtg	Att	Yds	Avg	TD	Rec	Yds	Avg	TD
2007	Texas A&M	0	0	(redshirt) Redshirted														
2008	Texas A&M	1	0	1	1	**100.0**	8	0	0	**167.2**	2	−8	−4.0	0	**55**	**844**	**15.3**	**5**
2009	Texas A&M	2	0	4	8	50.0	60	0	0	113.0	4	−5	−1.3	0	46	609	13.2	4
2010	Texas A&M	8	7	152	234	65.0	1,638	13	6	137.0	51	76	1.5	1	11	143	13.0	1
2011	Texas A&M	13	13	**327**	**531**	61.6	**3,744**	**29**	**15**	133.2	**58**	**306**	**5.3**	**4**	0	0	0.0	0
Total		24	20	484	774	62.5	5,450	42	21	134.2	115	369	3.2	5	112	1,596	14.3	10

== Career highlights ==
- NFL Comeback Player of the Year (2019)
- Pro Bowl (2019)
- NFL passer rating leader (2019)
- 2× NFL Top 100 — 68th (2020), 83rd (2021)

== Records and achievements ==
=== NFL records ===
- Most consecutive pass completions: 25 (tied by Philip Rivers & Nick Foles)

==== Dolphins franchise records ====
- Most pass completions in a single season: 392 (2014)
- Most pass completions by a rookie: 282
- Most passing yards by a rookie: 3,294
- Most passing attempts by a rookie: 484
- Longest rush by a quarterback: 48 yards
- Longest rush by a rookie quarterback: 31 yards

==== Titans franchise records ====
- Highest passer rating (career): 97.9
- Highest passer rating (season): 117.5 (2019)
- Most yards per pass attempt (season): 9.59 (2019)
- Highest completion rate (season): 70.3 (2019)

== Personal life ==
Tannehill and his wife, Lauren, whom he met in Panama City, Florida in 2009, got married in January 2012. They have two children.

Tannehill is an Evangelical Christian. He writes "Colossians 3:23", a reference to a Bible verse, along with his name when signing autographs.

Tannehill graduated with a bachelor's degree in biology in May 2011 and had planned to become an orthopedic surgeon specializing in knee injuries.

Tannehill has his own charitable foundation called Achieving Community and Education Success (ACES), which helps high school students with their grades and encourages them to get involved in their community. Tannehill also represented Lifewater International for the NFL's 2020 My Cause My Cleats campaign.

== See also ==
- List of National Football League annual passer rating leaders
- List of NFL quarterbacks who have posted a perfect passer rating
