= Alessandro Pizzorno =

Italian sociologist, political scientist, and philosopher (1924–2019)

- Born: 1 January 1924; Trieste, Friuli-Venezia Giulia, Italy
- Died: 4 April 2019 (aged 95); Florence, Tuscany, Italy

Academic background
- Education: University of Turin

Academic work
- Discipline: Sociologist
- Doctoral students: Ullica Segerstråle
- Main interests: Political sociology, class conflicts, economic systems in industrial societies

Alessandro Pizzorno (Trieste, 1 January 1924 – Florence, 4 April 2019) was an Italian sociologist, political scientist and philosopher.

== Career ==
He completed his philosophy studies at the University of Turin, and in social sciences in Vienna and Paris.

In 1953 he took over the management of the Olivetti Industrial Relations Center in Ivrea.

He taught at major Italian and foreign universities: University of Urbino, Milan State University, Oxford University (Nuffield College), Harvard University, Tehran University and at the European University Institute (I.U.E.) of Fiesole.

Pizzorno, in addition to studies on sociological matters, conducted research on economic and political sociology, especially on trade unions and class conflicts, on Italian politics and its aspects, on the relationships between political and economic systems in industrial societies.

He was awarded some prizes, including the Medal of the President of the Republic and the Pisa Literary National Award. He died on 4 April 2019 at the age of 95.
