= Richard Weikart =

- Born: July 1958 (age 67–68)
- Education: Texas Christian University (BA, MA); University of Iowa (PhD)
- Occupation: Professor of History at California State University, Stanislaus
- Known for: Historian of modern Germany, Advocate of intelligent design
- Spouse: Lisa Weikart
- Children: Joy, John, Joseph, Miriam, Christine, Hannah, and Sarah
- Website: csustan.edu/History/Faculty/Weikart/

Richard Weikart (born July 1958) is a professor of history at California State University, Stanislaus, advocate of intelligent design and senior fellow for the Center for Science and Culture of the Discovery Institute. In 1997 he joined the editorial board of the Access Research Network's Origins & Design Journal. Weikart's work focuses on claims about the impact of evolution on social thought, ethics and morality.

Weikart received a bachelor's degree in 1980 from Texas Christian University, a master's from Texas Christian University in 1989, and a doctorate in history from University of Iowa in 1994. He is married to Lisa Weikart with seven children.

== Biography ==
As a Christian in the 1970s, Weikart began studying intellectual history on the belief "that much modern thought had debased humanity." Weikart wrote in The Human Life Review, published by an anti-abortion organization, that "Darwinism has indeed devalued human life, leading to ideologies that promote the destruction of human lives deemed inferior to others ... Darwinism really is a matter of life and death." In an article published by Books and Culture: A Christian Review, he wrote "we need to counter our hedonistic, materialistic, and self-centered culture with true Christian compassion, self sacrifice, and self denial." Weikart is also a supporter of intelligent design.

Weikart is the author of four books, the first being The Myth of Dietrich Bonhoeffer: Is His Theology Evangelical? about the relationship of the theology of Dietrich Bonhoeffer (a founding member of the Confessing Church, who was hanged for his involvement in a plot to kill Adolf Hitler) to Evangelicalism. Weikart's second book is Socialist Darwinism: Evolution in German Socialist Thought from Marx to Bernstein, which contains work from his dissertation. The book argues that Karl Marx, Frederick Engels, August Bebel, Karl Kautsky and Eduard Bernstein "biologized" social theory for a "scientifically grounded socialist theory." Historian Daniel Gasman reviewed the book saying it should be read with "caution," and "Weikart's book inaugurates research into an important area of intellectual history, but the theoretical framework offered does not keep pace with the demanding complexity of the subject."

His third book, From Darwin to Hitler, has been widely criticized by the academic community and promoted by creationists. His fourth is a sequel, Hitler's Ethic, arguing that Adolf Hitler's "ideology revolved around evolutionary ethics -- the idea that whatever promoted evolutionary progress is good and whatever hinders it is bad." According to Weikart, "This evolutionary ethic shaped nearly every major feature of Nazi policy: eugenics (measures to improve human heredity, including compulsory sterilization), euthanasia, racism, population expansion, offensive warfare and racial extermination." Thomas Pegelow Kaplan, a historian at Davidson College, reviewed the book for Central European History noting Weikart "pushes his interpretations too far" because Weikart "does not sufficiently integrate the complex motivational factors" behind ideology, with Kaplan concluding Hitler's Ethic "offers little in terms of a new, fully convincing understanding of the Nazi dictator's thought." Gerwin Strobl, a historian at University of Cardiff, reviewed Hitler's Ethic in European History Quarterly, writing the introduction "reads like a mixture of a television voiceover and the worst kind of undergraduate essay" and described the book has two notable weaknesses: "how ‘Hitler’s ethics’ were disseminated within the party" and its "emphasis on intellectual developments inside Germany," which ignores "that Hitler had set out to copy what he regarded as the Anglo-American example." Eric Kurlander, in German Studies Review, wrote: "Though energetically drawn, this new iteration of the "intentionalist" argument invites skepticism in some respects, especially in its attempt to explain World War II and the Holocaust." Additionally, Larry Arnhart, a professor of Political Science at Northern Illinois University wrote, "As Weikart indicates, Hitler was a crude genetic determinist who believed that not only physical traits but even morality and culture were inherited genetically along racial lines, so that moral and cultural evolution depended on genetic evolution. But Weikart doesn't indicate to his readers that Darwin denied this." Weikart has responded to this review.

In 2016, Weikart published two books with Regnery Publishing, a conservative publishing house: The Death of Humanity: and the Case for Life (which was also translated in Dutch in 2019) and Hitler's Religion: The Twisted Beliefs that Drove the Third Reich. Weikart's The Death of Humanity: and the Case for Life "charts how influential atheist thinkers have approached ethical questions" with "many brief summaries of the thought processes of influential authors, scientists, philosophers, and lawyers who have rejected Judeo-Christian ethics". In Hitler's Religion, "Weikart offers no new scholarship: his strength is in his ability to organize existing, mostly primary-source, documentation into a readable and convincing whole" to show that Hitler was a pantheist.

== From Darwin to Hitler ==
Weikart is best known for his 2004 book From Darwin to Hitler: Evolutionary Ethics, Eugenics and Racism in Germany. The Discovery Institute, the hub of the intelligent design movement, funded the book's research. The academic community has been widely critical of the book. Regarding the thesis of Weikart's book, University of Chicago historian and Darwin scholar Robert Richards wrote that Hitler was not a Darwinian and criticized Weikart for trying to undermine evolution. Richards said that there was no evidence that Hitler read Darwin, and that some influencers of Nazism such as Houston Stewart Chamberlain were opposed to evolution. Weikart replied to Richards' criticisms by claiming Richards made several historical mistakes and anachronisms and was overly selective in his assertion of Hitler's beliefs.

== Bibliography ==
- Darwinian Racism: How Darwinism Influenced Hitler, Nazism, and White Nationalism (Discovery Institute, 2022) ISBN 978-1637120095
- Hitler's Religion: The Twisted Beliefs that Drove the Third Reich (Regnery History, 2016) ISBN 1621575004
- The Death of Humanity: and the Case for Life (Regnery Faith, 2016) ISBN 162157489X
- Hitler's Ethic: The Nazi Pursuit of Evolutionary Progress. (New York: Palgrave Macmillan, 2009) ISBN 0-230-61807-3
- From Darwin to Hitler, Evolutionary Ethics, Eugenics and Racism in Germany. (New York: Palgrave Macmillan, 2004) ISBN 1-4039-6502-1
- Socialist Darwinism: Evolution in German Socialist Thought from Marx to Bernstein. (San Francisco: International Scholars Publications, 1998) ISBN 978-1-57309-290-6
- The Myth of Dietrich Bonhoeffer: Is His Theology Evangelical? (San Francisco: International Scholars Publications, 1997) ISBN 1-57309-149-9
