= Josef Ludwig Reimer =

Austrian author

Josef Ludwig Reimer (1879–1955) was an author from Austria who wrote on pan-German ideology in the first decade of the 20th century. During a period of colonialism and nationalism, his books were ones of several advocating eastern expansion and ethnic cleansing of non-Germanic people including Slavs and Jews. Reimer also considered Latin America as one of the possible targets of the German economic exploitation. In his books Reimer extensively borrowed ideas of J.A. de Gobineau and H.S. Chamberlain applying these to the German case.

Notable works include Grundzüge deutscher Wiedergeburt (1906) and Ein pangermanisches Deutschland (1905).

== See also ==
- Pan-German League
- German Question
- Lebensraum
