= Sander Gliboff =

American historian

Sander Gliboff is a professor of History and Philosophy of Science at Indiana University. Gliboff earned a B.S. in biology from Cornell University in 1978, an M.A. at the University of North Carolina in 1981, and at Johns Hopkins University earned an M.A. in 1997 and a Ph.D. in 2001.

In 1999 his article, "Gregor Mendel and the Laws of Evolution," received the Ivan Slade Prize from The British Society for the History of Science.

== Publications ==
- "Gregor Mendel and the Laws of Evolution", History of Science, Volume 37, Part 2, Number 116, June 1999: 217-235.
- "The Case of Paul Kammerer: Evolution and Experimentation in the Early 20th Century," Journal of the History of Biology, 2006.
- "Evolution, Revolution, and Reform in Vienna: Franz Unger's Ideas on Descent and Their Post-1848," Journal of the History of Biology, 1998.
- "HG Bronn and the History of Nature," Journal of the History of Biology, 2007.
