= Larry Arnhart =

Political science professor (born 1949)

- Born: January 13, 1949 (age 77)
- Education: University of Chicago; University of Dallas
- Known for: Darwinian conservative theory
- Scientific career
- Fields: History of political philosophy, religion and political thought, ethics of biotechnology, philosophy of science and technology, bio-political theory, American political thought
- Workplaces: Northern Illinois University; Idaho State University; Rosary College

Larry Arnhart (born January 13, 1949) is a distinguished research professor emeritus of political science at Northern Illinois University. Arnhart has been described as one of the most prominent advocates of contemporary classical liberalism, along with Milton Friedman, George Stigler, Friedrich Hayek and Thomas Sowell. His areas of teaching and research include the history of political philosophy, biopolitical theory, and American political thought. Arnhart is the author of five books and more than forty peer-reviewed articles.

== Background and career ==
He has a Ph.D. in political science from the University of Chicago in 1977, an M.A. in political science from the University of Chicago in 1974, and a B.A. in politics from the University of Dallas in 1971.

In the Department of Political Science at Northern Illinois University, Arnhart teaches in the fields of political theory and biopolitics.

Arnhart is best known as a scholar in the history of political philosophy and as a proponent of "Darwinian natural right," "Darwinian conservatism," and "Aristotelian liberalism." He argues that the tradition of ethical naturalism from Aristotle to Thomas Aquinas to Alasdair MacIntyre can be supported by a Darwinian account of ethics as rooted in human biological nature, which combines liberty and order, freedom and virtue.

In defending Darwinian naturalism, Arnhart has debated the proponents of "intelligent design theory" by suggesting that they employ a purely negative rhetoric of criticizing Darwinian evolutionary theory, while offering no positive theory of exactly where, when, and how the "intelligent designer" intervenes in nature to create "irreducibly complex" mechanisms.

Arnhart has debated the leading advocates of intelligent design—Michael Behe, William Dembski, John West, Jonathan Wells, and Richard Weikart—all of whom are fellows of the Discovery Institute. John West has written a book attacking Arnhart — Darwin's Conservatives: A Misguided Quest.

In defending Darwinian conservatism, Arnhart tries to persuade conservatives that Darwinian science supports the conservative belief that social order arises not from rational planning but from the spontaneous order of instincts and habits. He suggests that Darwinian biology sustains conservative social thought by showing how the human capacity for spontaneous order arises from social instincts and a moral sense shaped by natural selection in human evolutionary history.

He has also developed a Darwinian argument for classical liberalism.

Recently, Arnhart finished writing the fourth edition of his book Political Questions: Political Philosophy from Plato to Pinker.

He is working on a new book — Darwinian Liberalism: The Evolutionary Science of Political Philosophy. This book will apply his Darwinian thinking to the history of political philosophy, while arguing for classical liberalism as supported by evolutionary science.

== Works ==
- "Human Nature is Here to Stay", The New Atlantis, Number 2, Summer 2003, pp. 65–78
- Aristotle on Political Reasoning: A Commentary on the “Rhetoric”. (DeKalb: Northern Illinois University Press, 1981; paperback edition, 1986).
- Political Questions: Political Philosophy from Plato to Rawls, first edition (New York: Macmillan Publishing Company, 1987), second edition (Prospect Heights, IL: Waveland Press, 1993), third edition (Prospect Heights, IL: Waveland Press, 2002). Turkish translation: Siyasi Dusunce Tarihi (Ankara: Adres Yayinlari, 2004).
- Political Questions: Political Philosophy from Plato to Pinker, fourth edition (Long Grove, IL: Waveland Press, 2016).
- Darwinian Natural Right: The Biological Ethics of Human Nature (Albany: State University of New York Press, 1998).
- Darwinian Conservatism (Exeter, UK: Imprint Academic, 2005).
- Darwinian Conservatism: A Disputed Question (Exeter, UK: Imprint Academic, 2009).
