= Nils Roll-Hansen =

Norwegian historian and philosopher (born 1938)

- Born: 1938 (age 87–88)
- Education: University of Oslo
- Scientific career
- Fields: History Philosophy
- Workplaces: University of Oslo

Nils Roll-Hansen (born 1938) is a historian and philosopher of 19th and 20th century biology at University of Oslo. He is the author of four books and many academic articles. His book The Lysenko Effect was praised in Nature. He is a member of the Norwegian Academy of Science and Letters.

== Cold War Contributions ==
Roll-Hansen was an avid exponent of the postwar capitalist bloc mobilization to reduce science to mechanism. The mechanistic reduction was the scientific establishment strategy pursued in accordance with a cautious shift into a new social mobility for technocrats in capitalist core countries. Sacrificing scientific validity and retarding the advancement of epigenetic knowledge in the West in favor of concentrating a growing technocratic labor force on mechanistic problems within the parameters of profitability and empire, Cold War mechanism in the West primarily opposed the Soviet Union's pursuit of democratic Enlightenment or organicist science, where the Soviet Union was required to explosively modernize agriculture as it was being attacked, while pursuing broader human development within its territory (Peterson 2019). However, organicist biologists outside the Soviet Union were also targeted by the Cold War politics of the Atlantic ruling class' scientific institutions. In his contributions to moral arguments forwarded for the Cold War Western bloc mechanistic turn, Roll-Hansen denigrated the validity-prioritizing scientific research agendas and theory of pre-Cold War organicist scientists in the West. In his "E.S. Russell and J.H. Woodger: The Failure of Two Twentieth Century Opponents of Mechanistic Biology," written at the Reagan-Thatcher zenith of the Cold War, Roll-Hansen asserts the allegiance to Cold War Red Baiting agenda that animated his career as an historian of science.

== Books ==
- The Lysenko Effect: The Politics Of Science. (Humanity Books, December 2004) ISBN 1-59102-262-2
- (co-author Gunnar Broberg), Eugenics And the Welfare State: Sterilization Policy in Demark, Sweden, Norway, and Finland (Uppsala Studies in History of Science, Nov 2005)
- Reductionism in biological research: Three historical case studies. (1979)
- Forskningens frihet og nødvendighet: Pasteurs teorier i vekst og forfall (Fakkel-bøkene)
