= Nick Jardine =

British academic

Nicholas Jardine FBA (born 4 September 1943) is a British mathematician, philosopher of science and its history, historian of astronomy and natural history, and amateur mycologist. He is Emeritus Professor at the Department of History and Philosophy of Science (HPS) at the University of Cambridge.

== Career ==
Jardine was educated at Monkton Combe School in Somerset and read natural sciences at King's College, Cambridge. He then worked as a King's College and Royal Society Research Fellow on the automation of classification and information retrieval and its applications to biological taxonomy and diagnosis. In 1975 he moved to Darwin College, Cambridge and to the Department of History and Philosophy of Science. Since then he has developed a question-based pragmatic philosophy of science (inspired by the work of Ian Hacking), as well as studying the history of early-modern astronomy and natural history, and reflecting on the methodology of the history of the sciences.

From 1987 to 2011 he was Senior Editor of Studies in History and Philosophy of Science and from 1998 of Studies in History and Philosophy of Biological and Biomedical Sciences. Since his retirement in 2010 he has been Senior Consultant to the Cambridge Scientific Heritage Project (2010–13) and principal investigator of the project Diagrams, Figures and the Transformation of Astronomy, 1450–1650 (2008–14).

== Hobbies ==
Jardine was a founding member in 1988 of the popular research seminar "The Cabinet of Natural History (Cambridge Group for the History of Natural History and the Environmental Sciences)". This is organised by staff and students of the Department of History and Philosophy of Science, and in term time it holds weekly seminars led by academic speakers. Jardine is a keen amateur mycologist and for over twenty years has led the annual HPS fungus hunt.

== Selected publications ==
- Jardine, Nicholas and Sibson, Robin (1971) Mathematical Taxonomy, Wiley: London and New York
- Jardine, Nicholas and van Rijsbergen, C. J. (1974) Automatic Document Classification and Retrieval, Office for Scientific and Technical Information Report No. 5134, distributed by the National Lending Library
- Jardine, Nicholas (1984) The Birth of History and Philosophy of Science. Kepler's 'A Defence of Tycho against Ursus' with Essays on its Provenance and Significance, Cambridge University Press (2nd rev. ed. 1988)
- Jardine, Nicholas (1986) The Fortunes of Inquiry, Clarendon Press: Oxford (1986)
- Cunningham, Andrew and Jardine, Nicholas eds (1990) Romanticism and the Sciences, Cambridge University Press.
- Jardine, Nicholas (1991) The Scenes of Inquiry: On the Reality of Questions in the Sciences, Oxford University Press (2nd ed. with supplementary essays 2000)
- Jardine, Nicholas, Secord, J.A., and Spary, E.C. eds (1996) Cultures of Natural History, Cambridge University Press hbk ISBN 0-521-45394-1; pbk ISBN 0-521-55894-8
- Frasca-Spada, Marina and Jardine, Nicholas eds (2000) Books and the Sciences in History, Cambridge University Press ISBN 0-521-65939-6
- Jardine, Nicholas, Frasca-Spada, Marina, Raven, Faith and Stearn, W. T. eds (2001) Plants and Plant Lore in Ancient Greece by J. E. Raven, Leopard's Head: Oxford; ISBN 0904920402
- Jardine, Nicholas and Segonds, Alain-Philippe eds (2008) La Guerre des astronomes: La querelle au sujet de l'origine du système géo-héliocentrique à la fin du XVIe siècle, Les Belles Lettres: Paris, 3 vols
- Jardine, Nicholas, and Raphael, R. eds (2010) Forms and Functions of Early Modern Celestial Imagery, Part I, special issue of Journal for the History of Astronomy 41/3
- Jardine, Nicholas, and Raphael, R. eds (2011) Forms and Functions of Early Modern Celestial Imagery, Part II, special issue of Journal for the History of Astronomy 42/1
- Jardine, Nicholas, and Fay, I. eds (2013) Observing the World through Images: Diagrams and Figures in the Early-Modern Arts and Sciences, Brill: Leiden
- Jardine, Nicholas, and Wilson, L. eds (2013) Recent Material Heritage of the Sciences, part special issue of Studies in History and Philosophy of Science 44/4
- Jardine, Nicholas, Granada, M.A, and Mosley, A. (2014) Christoph Rothmann's Treatise on the Comet of 1585: An Edition and Translation with Accompanying Essays, Brill: Leiden
