= Journal of the History of Biology =

- Discipline: History of biology
- Language: English
- Edited by: Nicolas Rasmussen and Vassiliki Betty Smocovitis

Publication details
- History: 1968-present
- Publisher: Springer Science+Business Media
- Frequency: Quarterly
- Impact factor: 0.953 (2017)

Standard abbreviations
- ISO 4: J. Hist. Biol.

Indexing
- CODEN: JHBIA9
- ISSN: 0022-5010 (print); 1573-0387 (web)
- LCCN: 68006147
- JSTOR: 00225010
- OCLC no.: 1783306

Links
- Journal homepage; Online archive

The Journal of the History of Biology is a quarterly peer-reviewed academic journal covering the history of biology as well as philosophical and social issues confronting biology. It is published by Springer Science+Business Media and the editors-in-chief are Nicolas Rasmussen (University of New South Wales) and Vassiliki Betty Smocovitis (University of Florida). According to the Journal Citation Reports, the journal has a 2015 impact factor of 0.897.
