= William Wimsatt =

William Wimsatt may refer to:

- William A. Wimsatt (born 1917), professor of Zoology
- William C. Wimsatt (born 1941), philosopher and teacher
- William K. Wimsatt (1907–1975), American professor of English
- William Upski Wimsatt (born 1973), graffiti artist, author, and activist
