= Griesemer =

Griesemer is a surname. Notable people with the surname include:

- James R. Griesemer, American philosophy academic
- John Griesemer (born 1947), American writer, journalist, and actor
- Robert Griesemer (born 1964), Swiss computer scientist
- Sam Griesemer (born 1984), better known as Samo Sound Boy, American DJ and record producer
