= Winsett =

Winsett is a surname. Notable people with the surname include:

- Jerry Winsett (born 1950), American actor, writer and singer
- R. E. Winsett (1876–1952), American composer and publisher
- Tom Winsett (1909–1987), American baseball player

== See also ==
- Wimsatt
