= William C. Wimsatt =

American philosopher (born 1941)

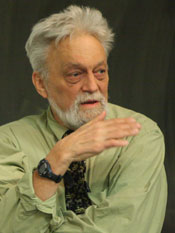
- Wimsatt in 2012
- Born: May 27, 1941 (age 85)
- Education: University of Pittsburgh
- Known for: Robustness; Heuristics; Generative entrenchment Reductionism; Complexity and organization
- Scientific career
- Fields: Philosophy of science Philosophy of biology Evolutionary biology
- Workplaces: University of Chicago; University of Minnesota

William C. Wimsatt (born May 27, 1941) is professor emeritus in the Department of Philosophy, the Committee on Conceptual and Historical Studies of Science (previously Conceptual Foundations of Science), and the Committee on Evolutionary Biology at the University of Chicago. He is currently a Winton Professor of the Liberal Arts at the University of Minnesota and a Residential Fellow of the Minnesota Center for Philosophy of Science. He specializes in the philosophy of biology, where his areas of interest include reductionism, heuristics, emergence, scientific modeling, heredity, and cultural evolution.

== Education and career ==
Wimsatt, as an undergraduate, began studying engineering physics at Cornell University. After working for a year as a designer in industry, he turned to philosophy receiving a BA degree magna cum laude in 1965. Wimsatt then went to the University of Pittsburgh on Woodrow Wilson National Fellowship Foundation and Mellon Fellowships. to study philosophy of science and received his PhD in 1971. His thesis consisted of a philosophical analysis of biological function. He published three papers from his dissertation: "Teleology and the Logical Structure of Function Statements", "Complexity and Organization", and "Reductionism, levels of organization, and the mind-body problem". From July 1969 to December 1970, he was a postdoctoral fellow in population biology with Richard Lewontin at the University of Chicago, and was subsequently hired as an assistant professor of Philosophy in 1971 and promoted to full professor in 1981.

In 2007, Wimsatt was named the Peter H. Ritzma Professor in Philosophy and Evolutionary Biology. He has been a visiting Distinguished Professor at Ohio State University, visiting Hurst Professor and a Clark-Way Harrison Distinguished Visitor at Washington University in St. Louis, a fellow at the Rockefeller Foundation's Bellagio Study and Conference Center in Italy, a senior fellow at the Konrad Lorenz Institute for Evolution and Cognition Research in Vienna, Austria, Winton University Professor at the University of Minnesota, and a fellow at the Franke Humanities Institute in Chicago. He is on the scientific advisory board of the Land Institute.

Among his former students are William Bechtel, James R. Griesemer, and Sahotra Sarkar.

Wimsatt was awarded the 2013 David Hull award for outstanding contributions to Philosophy of Biology and support of students in the profession by the International Society for History Philosophy and Social Studies of Biology.

=== Personal ===
Wimsatt is the son of the late William A. Wimsatt who was a Cornell University professor specializing in bats. He was married to Barbara Horberg on June 13, 1971. He has one son, William Upski Wimsatt, known as an author and political activist.

== Philosophical work ==
Wimsatt's philosophical position starts with two themes: we are limited beings and the world we try to understand is complex. The problem then is how to build a philosophical world view based on these two themes. For Wimsatt, robustness (e.g., believing that a particular apple exists because we can see it, feel it, smell it, taste it, and hear it crunch when we eat it) is fundamental for accessing what exists in the world. The more we can detect things in multiple ways, the more we are inclined to believe they exist. Closely connected to robustness are the heuristics, which we use to think about the world and are foundational to his epistemology. They are rules of thumb, which can be wrong or biased but tend to work when applied to what is robust in the world. For Wimsatt, questions of realism (i.e., what exists) are not separable from questions of epistemology (i.e., what we can know) and the discovery of what exists. This may appear circular, but it is by evolution that we have evolved multiple ways of detecting things in the world.

Richard Lewontin, Richard Levins, Herbert A. Simon, Stuart Kauffman, and Donald T. Campbell are all important influences on Wimsatt's work. Some of the most important commentators on Wimsatt's writings are his students, many of whom are now working as philosophers of science and scientists, e.g. Marshall Abrams, Douglas Allchin, Irene Appelbaum, William Bechtel, Stuart Glennan, James R. Griesemer, Jeffry Ramsey, Sahotra Sarkar, Jeffrey Schank, and Marty Sereno.

== Selected publications ==
- (1972). "Teleology and the Logical Structure of Function Statements." Studies in History and Philosophy of Science 3: 1-80.
- (1980). "Reductionistic Research Strategies and their Biases in the Units of Selection Controversy." In Scientific Discovery: Case Studies, ed. T. Nickles, pp. 213–259.
- (1981). "Units of Selection and the Structure of the Multi-Level Genome." PSA 1980: 122-183.
- (1986). "Developmental Constraints, Generative Entrenchment, and the Innate-Acquired Distinction." In Integrating Scientific Disciplines, ed. W. Bechtel, pp. 185–208.
- (1997). "Functional Organization, Functional Analogy, and Functional Inference." Evolution and Cognition 3: 2-32.
- (1999). "Genes, Memes, and Cultural Heredity." Biology and Philosophy 14: 279-310
- (2007). Re-Engineering Philosophy for Limited Beings: Piecewise Approximations to Reality. Cambridge: Harvard University Press.
