= Wimsatt =

Wimsatt is a surname. Notable people with the surname include:

- Gavin Wimsatt (born 2003), American football player
- William Wimsatt, multiple people
