= St. John's College High School =

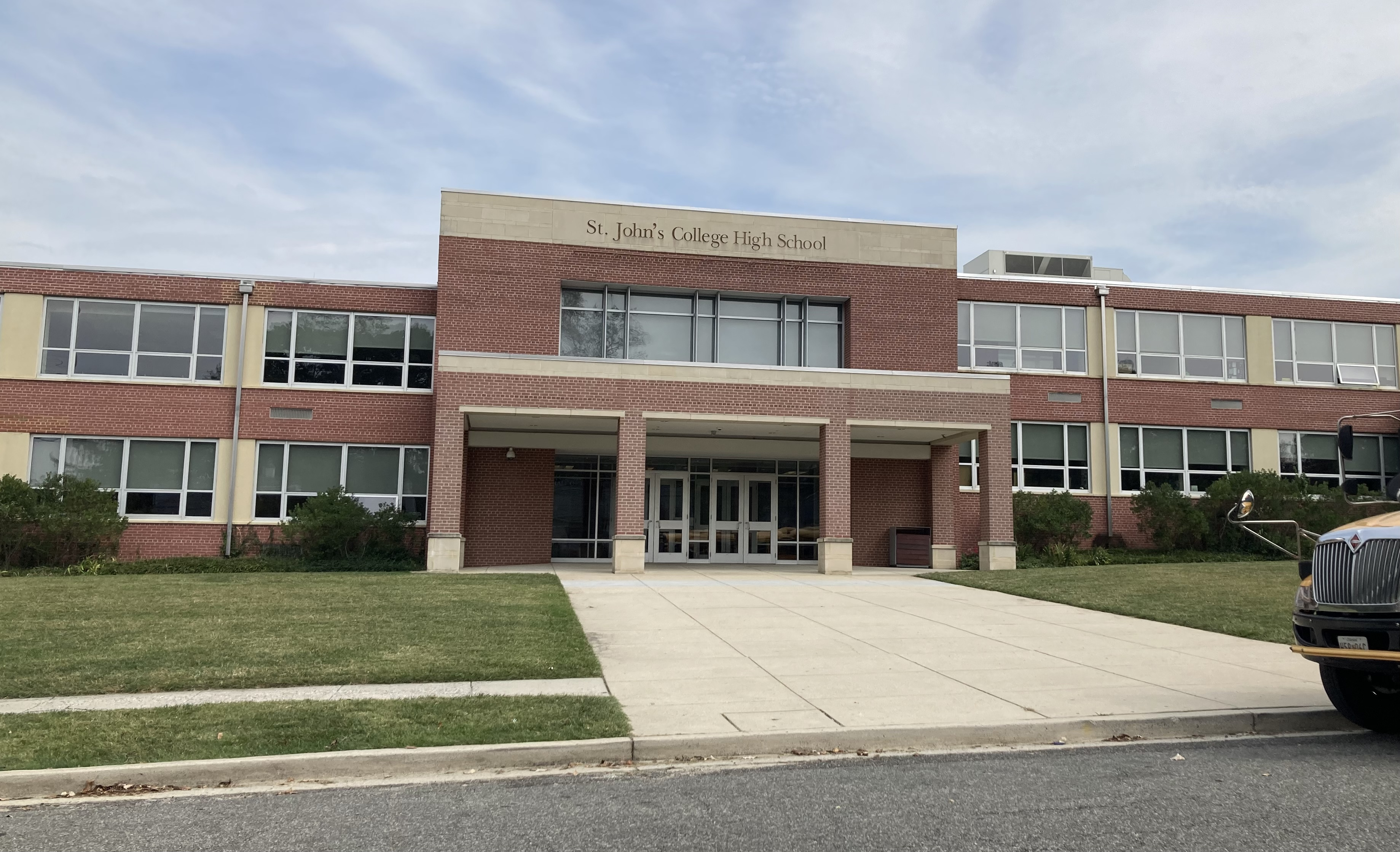

Location
- 2607 Military Road, NW; Chevy Chase, Washington, D.C. 20015; United States; 38°57′44″N 77°3′17″W

Information
- Type: Private
- Motto: Religio, Scientia (Latin) (Religion, Science)
- Religious affiliations: Roman Catholic (Lasallian)
- Established: 1851 (175 years ago)
- CEEB code: 090185
- President: Kevin Haley
- Principal: Ian MacInnes
- Faculty: 125.0 (on an FTE basis)
- Gender: Coeducational
- Enrollment: 1,279 (2024-25)
- Student to teacher ratio: 9,7
- Campus size: 30 acres (120,000 m^{2})
- Campus type: Suburban
- Colors: Scarlet and gray
- Athletics conference: WCAC
- Nickname: Cadets
- Rival: Gonzaga College High School
- Accreditation: MSA
- Newspaper: The Sabre
- Website: www.stjohnschs.org

St. John's College High School (SJC, SJCHS, or St. John's) is a Catholic high school in Washington, D.C. Established in 1851, it is the third oldest Christian Brothers school in the United States, and was one of the oldest Army JROTC schools until the program was abolished in 2019 in pursuit of a private "leadership academy" program with no relationship to the United States Armed Forces.

== History ==
In 1878, the Brothers purchased the property at 1225 Vermont Avenue NW from the estate of General Montgomery C. Meigs as the site for a new school building. In August of that year, the construction of the building began. At first, it was known as St. John's Collegiate Institute, and in 1887, it assumed the title of St. John's College. That same year, the college was incorporated under the District of Columbia statutes with the power to confer the academic degrees of Bachelor of Arts and Master of Arts. At the commencement of June 26, 1888, two Bachelor of Arts, four Bachelor of Science, and three Master of Arts degrees were conferred on graduates.

As the undergraduate departments of The Catholic University of America and Georgetown University expanded, it was decided in 1921 by the Board of Trustees of St. John's to discontinue the college department and devote the school facilities to secondary education alone.

== Military program ==
A military cadet company was established at the school in 1915 after an inspection by the War Department, which detailed Major John Augustus Dapray, retired, to the school on December 30, 1915 as the first professor of military science and tactics. The school later established a Junior Reserve Officers' Training Corps program which was one of 100 original U.S. Army JROTC programs established by the U.S. Congress under the National Defense Act of 1916.

In addition to regular classroom instruction, cadets participate in regional and national competitions as members of the Raiders (called the Rangers until 1994), the drill team (called the "McGovern Rifles";the rifle team (marksmanship club), and color guard. The regiment participates in many events each year, such as the annual Cherry Blossom Parade and Presidential inaugurations (including the 2005 Inauguration of George W. Bush). Originally mandatory, the program became optional in 1991. By 2005, 50 percent of the students participated in the JROTC program, and participation fell less than one-fifth of the student body. In 2019 the military program ended and was replaced with a Cadet Corps program with no relationship to the formal JROTC Program but it still produces students who decide to attend one of the service academies. Current participation estimates have almost a quarter of the school in the cadet corps program, or almost 300 of the 1200 total students.

== Athletics ==
St. John's teams play in the Washington Catholic Athletic Conference.

=== Football ===
The 2008 St. John's vs. Gonzaga College High School football game was recognized as one of the top 25 rivalries in the United States by inclusion in the Great American Rivalry Series. In 2013 the varsity football team defeated their historical rival Gonzaga in the WCAC semi-finals, advancing to the championship game for the first time in over 20 years, which they lost to the Dematha Stags.

On November 18, 2017, St. John’s varsity football team defeated Gonzaga 30-7 to win the 2017 WCAC championship. They finished the season being undefeated in the WCAC for the first time since 1976 and winning the school’s first football conference championship since 1989. The 2017 team is also the only St. John's football team to ever defeat both DeMatha (first win since 1994) and Gonzaga twice in the same season. In 2017 the St. John's varsity football team finished their season ranked 17th and 19th in the United States, after starting the pre-season ranked No. 21.

=== Soccer ===
In 2007, the St. John's girls' soccer team was ranked #1 in the United States.

=== Baseball ===
St. John's varsity baseball team won the 2018 WCAC baseball championship, the fifth consecutive title for the school, and the sixth title since 2010.

=== Athletic facilities ===
The campus features three multi-sport turf surfaces used for field hockey, football, lacrosse, rugby, soccer and softball. Baseball plays at Gibbs Field. Gallagher Gymnasium is the home of the basketball, volleyball and wrestling teams. The school also used tennis courts on site, but they were removed when Gallagher gym was expanded.

== Notable alumni ==
- Lindsay Allen (class of 2013), WNBA basketball player
- Laz Alonso, actor
- Tariq Boney (class of 2026), college football defensive end for the Michigan Wolverines
- Michael P. C. Carns (class of 1955), retired United States Air Force General, former Vice Chief of Staff of the United States Air Force.
- Jorge L. Córdova (class of 1924), Associate Justice of the Supreme Court of Puerto Rico and Puerto Rico's eleventh Resident Commissioner.
- John H. Dimond (class of 1936), Alaska Supreme Court justice.
- Jeff Dowtin Jr. (class of 2015), professional basketball player.
- Edward H. Forney (class of 1927), United States Marine Corps brigadier general. During the Korean War he organized the largest U.S. amphibious evacuation of civilians, under combat conditions, in American history.
- Lennard Freeman (class of 2013), player in the Israeli Basketball Premier League
- Azzi Fudd (class of 2021), WNBA basketball player for Dallas Wings, college basketball player for the Connecticut Huskies
- John Geisse (class of 1937), founder of Target and served in the United States Navy.
- Philip Hannan (class of 1931), 11th archbishop of New Orleans.
- Kasim Hill (class of 2017), college football player
- L.J. Hoes (class of 2008), former MLB player.
- Branden Jacobs-Jenkins (class of 2002), Tony-winning playwright of Appropriate.
- Rakim Jarrett (class of 2020), NFL player with the Tampa Bay Buccaneers
- Quinten Johnson (class of 2019), college football defensive back for the Michigan Wolverines
- James "Jim" Kimsey (class of 1957), first chairman and CEO of AOL
- Terrell Lewis (class of 2016), professional football player for the Philadelphia Eagles
- Malik Mack (class of 2023), college basketball player
- Princess Ariana Austin Makonnen of Ethiopia (class of 2001), member of the Ethiopian Imperial House of Solomon; wife of Prince Joel Dawit Makonnen
- James J. Malloy (class of 1981), retired United States Navy vice admiral.
- Stanley McChrystal (class of 1972), retired United States Army general who served as Director of Joint Staff.
- Robert M. McGovern (class of 1946), received the Medal of Honor for his sacrifice in the Korean War.
- Makenna Morris (class of 2020), NWSL soccer player
- Tre'Mon Morris-Brash (class of 2019), professional football player for the Los Angeles Chargers
- Jeremiah A. O'Leary (class of 1937), USMC veteran, prize-winning journalist, past president of the White House Correspondents' Association.
- Kevin Plank (class of 1990), founder and brand chief and executive chairman of Under Armour.
- Joseph A. Rattigan (class of 1936), California state senator, justice on the California Court of Appeals.
- Keilan Robinson (class of 2019), NFL running back and return specialist with the Jacksonville Jaguars; played college football for the Texas Longhorns
- Cam Ross (class of 2019), NFL wide receiver for the Denver Broncos
- Joseph Siravo (class of 1973), actor, director, teacher and producer.
- William A. Wimsatt (class of 1935), professor of Zoology, Chairman of the Department of Zoology at Cornell University.
- Nolan Williams, Jr. (class of 1986), composer, musicologist, and producer.
- James Wood professional MLB baseball player.
