= Sahotra Sarkar =

Indian-American biologist

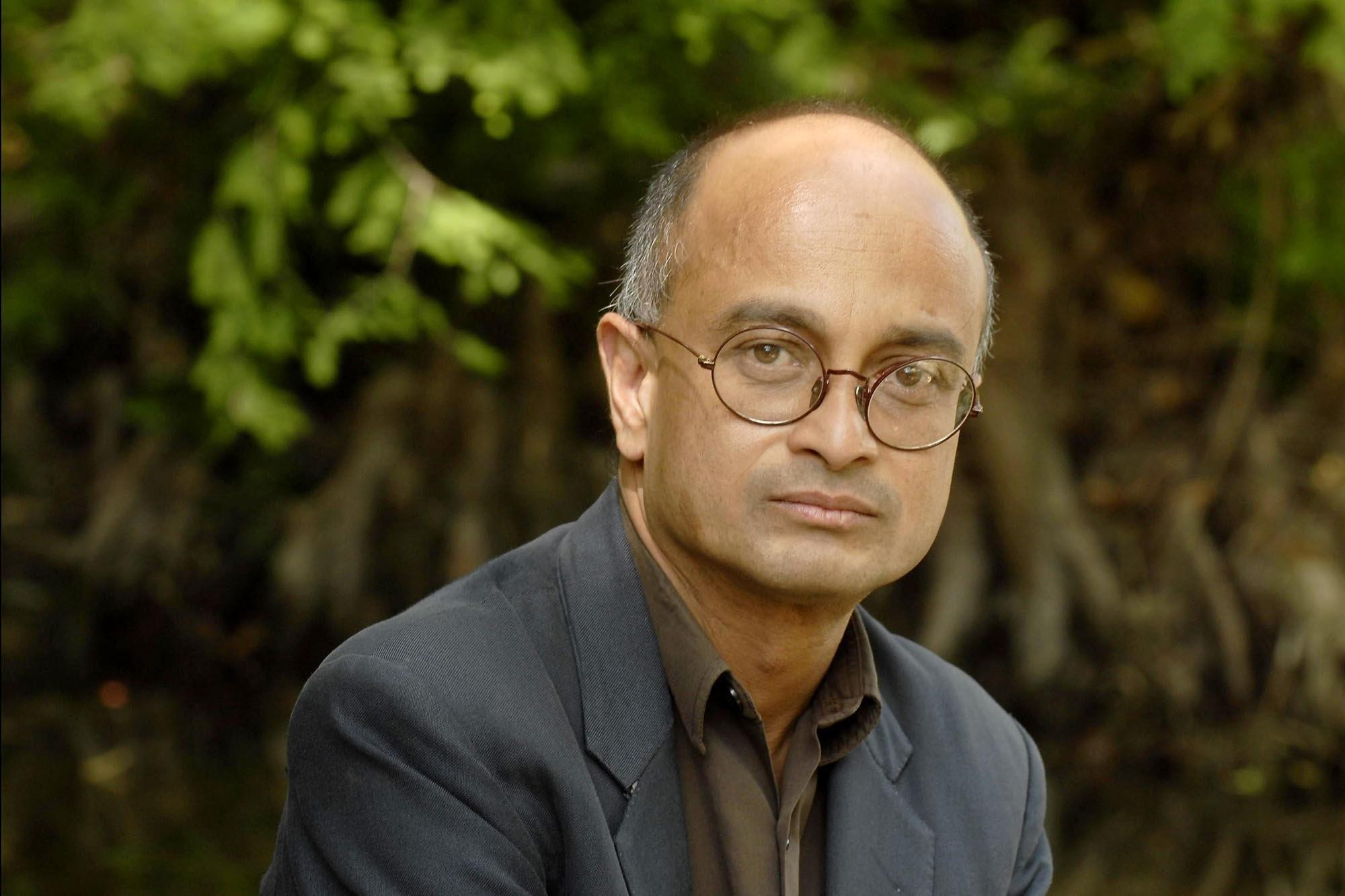
- Born: 1962 (age 63–64)
- Education: Columbia University; University of Chicago
- Scientific career
- Fields: Conservation biology
- Workplaces: McGill University; University of Texas at Austin

Sahotra Sarkar (born 1962) is an Indian-American professor at the University of Texas at Austin, specializing in the philosophy of biology.

== Education and career ==
Sarkar is originally from India where he lived in Darjeeling until 1975. He earned a B.A. from Columbia University, where he won a Van Amringe Mathematical Prize, and an M.A. and Ph.D. from the University of Chicago where he worked with William C. Wimsatt. He was a Fellow of the Wissenschaftskolleg zu Berlin (1996–1997), the Dibner Institute for the History of Science and Technology (1993–1994), and the Edelstein Centre for the Philosophy of Science (1992). He was a visiting scholar at the Max Planck Institute for the History of Science in Berlin (1997–1998, 2002–2003) and taught at Montreal's McGill University before moving to Texas.

== Philosophical and scientific work ==
Sarkar is one of the founders of systematic conservation planning within conservation biology, promoting the use of multi-criteria decision analysis and supervising the creation of the ConsNet decision support system. In this context he has advocated participatory environmental planning and strongly criticized the imposition of authoritarian and discriminatory environmental policies on local residents. His laboratory also works on a suite of neglected tropical diseases (or diseases of poverty) including Chagas disease, dengue, leishmaniasis, and tick-borne diseases.

In the philosophy of biology, Sarkar is known for his work on reductionism and criticism of hereditarian thinking in biology as well as the use of informational concepts in molecular biology. In the philosophy of physics Sarkar is known for controversially defending the conventionalism of simultaneity in special relativity (with John Stachel) and suggesting a stochastic modification of quantum dynamics. Earlier in his career he worked in mathematical population genetics where, in collaboration with Wing Ma and Guido Sandri, he was responsible for the standard recursion relation to compute the Luria–Delbrück distribution in bacterial genetics.

Sarkar is also a noted critic of creationism and intelligent design and played an important role in combating attempts to introduce creationism into high school curricula in Texas.

== Allegations of sexual misconduct ==
In 2017, Sahotra Sarkar was suspended for a semester after multiple allegations of sexual misconduct with students, including allegations that Sarkar "invited complainants to go swimming with him at nude beach, propositioned complainants to pose nude for photographs, held many school-related meetings at bars, and led discussions that were sexual in nature and uncomfortable for the complainants." Although he denied some of the allegations, he admitted to discussing the possibility of one student posing for nude photographs for money. In November 2019, a group of students interrupted a class Sarkar was teaching in order to protest his continued presence at the university.

== Books ==
- Sahotra Sarkar, Genetics and Reductionism (Cambridge Studies in Philosophy and Biology). Cambridge University Press (October 13, 1998) ISBN 0-521-63713-9
- Sahotra Sarkar, Molecular Models of Life: Philosophical Papers on Molecular Biology (Life and Mind: Philosophical Issues in Biology and Psychology). The MIT Press (March 30, 2007) ISBN 0-262-69350-X
- Sahotra Sarkar, Biodiversity and Environmental Philosophy: An Introduction (Cambridge Studies in Philosophy and Biology). Cambridge University Press (September 19, 2005) ISBN 0-521-85132-7
- Sahotra Sarkar, Doubting Darwin: Creationist Designs on Evolution. Blackwell (April 20, 2007) ISBN 1-4051-5491-8
- Sahotra Sarkar, Environmental Philosophy: From Theory to Practice. Wiley-Blackewell (2012)
- Chris Margules and Sahotra Sarkar, Systematic Conservation Planning (Ecology, Biodiversity and Conservation). Cambridge University Press. (October 8, 2007) ISBN 0-521-70344-1
- Sahotra Sarkar, Ed., Science and Philosophy in the Twentieth Century: Basic Works of Logical Empiricism. 6 Volumes. Routledge (February 1, 1996)
- Sahotra Sarkar, Ed., Logical Empiricism and the Special Sciences : Reichenbach, Feigl, and Nagel (Science and Philosophy in the Twentieth Century: Basic Works of Logical Empiricism) Routledge; 1 edition (February 1, 1996) ISBN 0-8153-2265-8
- Sahotra Sarkar and Jessica Pfeifer, Eds., The Philosophy of Science: An Encyclopedia Routledge.(December 9, 2005)
- Sahotra Sarkar and Anya Plutynksi, Eds., Companion to the Philosophy of Biology (Blackwell Companions to Philosophy). Wiley-Blackwell (March 14, 2008) ISBN 1-4051-2572-1
