= White Dudes for Harris =

Group of male voters supporting 2024 campaign

- Formation: 2024
- Founder: Ross Morales Rocketto
- Purpose: Campaign advocacy group

White Dudes for Harris was a group of white male voters that supported the Kamala Harris 2024 presidential campaign. Ross Morales Rocketto founded the group, which was organized with Mike Nellis, Brad Bauman, Aaron Florence-Weinberg, Tim Fullerton, and Sam Drzymala.

In July 2024, a fundraiser with approximately 190,000 participants raised more than $4 million. Attendees included politicians Pete Buttigieg, Roy Cooper, J. B. Pritzker, Tim Walz, and David Hogg, as well as Sean Astin, Lance Bass, Jeff Bridges, Josh Gad, Joseph Gordon-Levitt, Josh Groban, Mark Hamill, Ryan Flaherty, Paul Scheer, and Bradley Whitford.

The White Dudes for Harris account on Twitter was suspended following the fundraiser in July 2024, causing the group to accuse Twitter CEO Elon Musk of politically targeting them to influence the 2024 United States presidential election.
