= Bomb the Suburbs =

Graffiti book

- Cover of the 2008 Catapult edition
- Author: William Upski Wimsatt
- Illustrator: Margarita Certeza Garcia
- Language: English
- Release number: 3,000
- Subject: Urban Culture
- Set in: Chicago
- Publisher: Subway and Elevated Press (Soft Skull Press), Catapult
- Publication date: 1994
- Publication place: United States
- Media type: Book
- Pages: 112
- ISBN: 0-9643855-0-3

Bomb The Suburbs is a collection of essays by William Upski Wimsatt, a former graffiti tagger. It is a mix of storytelling, journalism, photojournalism and original research, on a broad range of topics, such as suburban sprawl, hip hop culture, youth activism, graffiti, and Chicago. In the book Wimsatt presents hip hop as a force for social justice and political change.

== Reception ==
The editor of Newcity has identified Bomb the Suburbs as "perhaps the definitive work of hip-hop literature".

Bomb The Suburbs led to subsequent books and political activism. In an essay in his No More Prisons compilation, entitled "In Defense of Rich Kids", Wimsatt responded to class based critique of his social privilege:

"You can hate me if you want to. I am the beneficiary of a very unfair system. The system gives me tons of free money for doing nothing, yet it forces you to work two and three jobs just to get out of debt."
