= James R. Griesemer =

American philosopher

James R. Griesemer is an American professor of philosophy at the University of California, Davis in Davis, California specializing in philosophy of biology.

== Education and career ==
Griesemer received his PhD in 1983 in the Conceptual Foundations of Science at the University of Chicago under the supervision of William C. Wimsatt. He joined the faculty at University of California, Davis in 1984, and has taught there ever since. He is currently a "Distinguished Professor."

He was President of the International Society for the History, Philosophy, and Social Studies of Biology (ISHPSSB) from 2007 to 2009.

== Philosophical work ==
His research focuses on the history and philosophy of biology, including models and practices in museum-based natural history, laboratory-based ecology, units of inheritance and selection in evolutionary biology, and visual representation in embryology and genetics.
