= William A. Wimsatt =

American academic (1917–1985)

- Wimsatt, c. 1957
- Born: William Abell Wimsatt; July 28, 1917; Washington, D. C., US
- Died: January 9, 1985 (aged 67); Ithaca, New York, US
- Education: Cornell University
- Known for: Biology of bats Reproductive anatomy
- Awards: Fellow of AAAS; Guggenheim Fellowship; Gerrit R. Miller prize
- Scientific career
- Fields: Biology of bats Reproduction
- Workplaces: Cornell University
- Doctoral advisor: Arthur "Doc" Allen

William A. Wimsatt (July 28, 1917 – January 9, 1985) was an American academic who was a professor of Zoology and Chairman of the Department of Zoology at Cornell University. From 1945 until 1960, Wimsatt taught courses in histology and embryology in the College of Arts and Sciences and also in the New York State College of Veterinary Medicine. He was well known for his pioneering research on the interrelationships of hibernation and reproduction and the biology of bats.

== Biography ==
=== Intellectual ===
When Wimsatt was a student at St. John's College High School in Washington, D.C., he attended a lecture by Professor Arthur "Doc" Allen (who founded the Cornell Lab of Ornithology). This triggered a strong desire in Wimsatt to study at Cornell. Due to his mother’s illness, he was unable to transfer from Catholic University in Washington to Cornell, but after her death he did. After he graduated, he became one of “Doc” Allen’s graduate students in ornithology before eventually switching to study Bats In 1943, after Wimsatt received his doctorate at Cornell under Howard Adelman, he became an instructor of anatomy at Harvard Medical School. In 1945, he returned to Cornell and was appointed assistant professor of zoology. In 1947, he was promoted to associate professor and in 1951, he was promoted to professor of zoology; a position he held until his death.

Wimsatt made many research trips to Central and South America and the Caribbean Islands, but his most desired research trips were to the tropics of Mexico. In 1962, he spent a year working with Dr. Bernardo Villa at the University of Mexico after receiving a Guggenheim Fellowship. He spent three sabbatical leaves at the University of Arizona College of Medicine working with Dr. Philip Krutzsch, who shared similar research interests. He was a widely acclaimed as editor of the series Biology of Bats. His expertise was on the functional morphology of placentae. A look at his publications reveals his ability to use novel approaches in diverse areas of reproductive biology (e.g., embryology, placentation, and fetal membranes), ecological physiology, hibernation, and the integumentary, urinary, and digestive systems. This broad background served him well as an Associate Editor of The American Journal of Anatomy from 1974 until shortly before his death.

Wimsatt was a member of the Board of Trustees of Cornell University from 1960 through 1965. He served for many years as a Director of the Cornell University Research Foundation, Inc. He was a member of Sigma Xi, Phi Kappa Phi, and Phi Zeta; a Fellow of the American Association for the Advancement of Science, a member of the American Association of Anatomists, the American Society of Mammalogists, the Histochemical Society, the Society for the Study of Reproduction, and the American Society of Zoologists. He helped found the Annual North American Symposium on Bat Research and in 1981 he was awarded the Gerrit R. Miller prize “for his outstanding record of contributions to chiropteran biology.”

=== Personal ===
Wimsatt was born in Washington D. C., the son of Alma Engebretson Cheyney and William Church Wimsatt. In 1940, Wimsatt married Ruth Claire Peterson (a fellow student at Cornell). He had six children, William C. Wimsatt, Jr., Ph.D.; Michael, M.D.; John, A.A.S.; Mary, M. A.; Jeffrey, D.V.M.; and Ruth, B.S., five of which also received degrees from Cornell. He died of cancer January 9, 1985.

== Selected publications ==
- Wimsatt, W. A.; Enders, AC. (1980). "Structure and morphogenesis of the uterus, placenta, and paraplacental organs of the neotropical disc-winged bat Thyroptera tricolor spix (Microchiroptera: Thyropteridae)". Am J Anat. 159 (2): 209–43. doi:10.1002/aja.1001590208. PMID 7446448.
- Wimsatt, W. A. (May 1979). "Reproductive asymmetry and unilateral pregnancy in Chiroptera". J Reprod Fertil. 56 (1): 345–57. doi:10.1530/jrf.0.0560345. PMID 381652.
- Wimsatt, W. A. (Feb 1975). "Some comparative aspects of implantation". Biol Reprod. 12 (1): 1–40. doi:10.1095/biolreprod12.1.1. PMID 806310.
- Wimsatt, W. A. (Aug 1974). "Morphogenesis of the fetal membranes and placenta of the black bear, Ursus americanus (Pallas)". Am J Anat. 140 (4): 471–95. doi:10.1002/aja.1001400403. PMID 4844439.
- Wimsatt, W. A. Enders A. C.; Mossman, H. W. (Oct 1973). "A reexamination of the chorioallantoic placental membrane of a shrew, Blarina brevicauda: resolution of a controversy". Am J Anat. 138 (2): 207–33. doi:10.1002/aja.1001380207. PMID 4747737.
- Wimsatt, W. A. Villa B. (Sep 1970). "Locomotor adaptations in the disc-winged bat thyroptera tricolor. I. Functional organization of the adhesive discs". Am J Anat. 129 (1): 89–119. doi:10.1002/aja.1001290107. PMID 5479261.
- Wimsatt, W. A. (1969). "Some interrelations of reproduction and hibernation in mammals". Symp Soc Exp Biol. 23: 511–49. PMID 5367180.
- Wimsatt, W. A. (Dec 1962). "Some aspects of the comparative anatomy of the mammalian placenta". Am J Obstet Gynecol. 84 (11): 1568–94. doi:10.1016/0002-9378(62)90004-2. PMID 14001118.
- Wimsatt, W. A. Gopalakrishna A. (Jul 1958). "Occurrence of a placental hematoma in the primitie sheath-tailed bats (Emballonuridae), with observations on its structure, development and histochemistry". Am J Anat. 103 (1): 35–67. doi:10.1002/aja.1001030103. PMID 13626837.
- Wimsatt, W. A. (1958). "The allantoic-placental barrier in Chiroptera: a new concept of its organization and histochemistry". Acta Anat (Basel). 32 (1–2): 141–86. doi:10.1159/000141319. PMID 13507912.
- Wimsatt, W. A.; Kallen, F. C. (Sep 1957). "The unique maturation response of the graafian follicles of hibernating vespertilionid bats and the question of its significance". Anat. Rec. 129 (1): 115–31. doi:10.1002/ar.1091290110. S2CID 38855210.
- Wimsatt, W. A. (Mar 1955). "On the nature of the interscapular gland of the tropical American fruit bat Artibeus jamaicensis Leach". Anat. Rec. 121 (3): 549–63. doi:10.1002/ar.1091210307. PMID 14376896. S2CID 31492449.
- Wimsatt, W. A. (1954). "The fetal membranes and placentation of the tropical American vampire bat Desmodus rotundus murinus, with notes on the histochemistry of the placenta". Acta Anat (Basel). 21 (4): 285–341. doi:10.1159/000140938. PMID 13196828.
- Wimsatt, W. A.; Trapido, H. (Nov 1952). "Reproduction and the female reproductive cycle in the tropical American vampire bat, desmodus rotundus murinus". Am J Anat. 91 (3): 415–45. doi:10.1002/aja.1000910304. PMID 12996445.
- Wimsatt, W. A. (Sep 1951). "Observations on the morphogenesis, cytochemistry, and significance of the binocleate giant cells of the placenta of ruminants". Am J Anat. 89 (2): 233–81. doi:10.1002/aja.1000890204. PMID 14894441.
- Wimsatt, W. A. (Nov 1950). "New histological observations on the placenta of the sheep". Am J Anat. 87 (3): 391–457. doi:10.1002/aja.1000870304. PMID 14789741.
- Wimsatt, W. A. (Jan 1949). "Cytochemical observations on the fetal membranes and placenta of the bat, Myotis lucifugus lucifugus". Am J Anat. 84 (1): 63–141. doi:10.1002/aja.1000840104. PMID 18141487.
- Wimsatt, W. A. (May 1948). "The nature and distribution of lipoids in the placenta of the bat, Myotis lucifugus lucifugs, with observations on the mitochondria and Golgi apparatus". Am J Anat. 82 (3): 393–467. doi:10.1002/aja.1000820303. PMID 18915624.
- Wimsatt, W. A. Weslocki G. B. (May 1947). "The placentation of the American shrews, Blarina brevicauda and Sorex fumeus". Am J Anat. 80 (3): 361–435. doi:10.1002/aja.1000800304. PMID 20296012.
