= William Bechtel =

American philosopher

P. William Bechtel
- Born: 1951 (age 74–75)

Academic background
- Education: University of Chicago
- Thesis: Intentionality and Quine's epistemological enterprise (1977)
- Doctoral advisor: Manley Thompson; Daniel Garber

Academic work
- Discipline: Philosophy
- Sub-discipline: Philosophy of science
- Institutions: University of California, San Diego

William Bechtel (born 1951) is an emeritus professor of philosophy in the Department of Philosophy and the Science Studies Program at the University of California, San Diego. He was a professor of philosophy at Washington University in St. Louis from 1994 until 2002 . Bechtel was also the chair of the Philosophy Department from 1999 until 2002 and was heavily involved with the Philosophy-Psychology-Neuroscience program, serving at different times as Assistant Director and Director. Before that, he was a professor of philosophy at Georgia State University. Bechtel earned his PhD from the University of Chicago and his BA from Kenyon College.

Bechtel's work in philosophy has focused on the philosophy of the life sciences. In particular, he has worked on cell biology, biochemistry, neuroscience, and cognitive science. Bechtel advocates a mechanistic approach to philosophy of science, taking the view that phenomena are often explained by specifying mechanisms. He argues that although this is more naturally in accordance with the actual methodology of life scientists, it contrasts with the traditional model of deduction from laws supported by mainstream philosophy of science.

Bechtel has also written about the nature of scientific discovery. He was the editor of the journal Philosophical Psychology for 30 years.

== Books ==
- Mental Mechanisms: Philosophical Perspectives on Cognitive Neuroscience. London: Routledge
- Discovering Cell Mechanisms. The Creation of Modern Cell Biology. Cambridge University Press. 2006.
- Connectionism and the Mind: Parallel Processing, Dynamics, and Evolution in Networks. Basil Blackwell. 2002.
- Discovering Complexity. Princeton University Press. 1993.
- Bechtel, William (1988). Philosophy of science: an overview for cognitive science. Hillsdale, New Jersey: L. Erlbaum. ISBN 9780805802214. OCLC 875311964.
- Bechtel, William (1988). Philosophy of mind: an overview for cognitive science. Hillsdale, New Jersey: L. Erlbaum Associates. ISBN 9780805802344. OCLC 856811636.
