= William Upski Wimsatt =

American author and political activist

- Born: 1972 (age 53–54); Chicago, Illinois
- Other name: Billy Wimsatt
- Occupations: Author, political activist
- Known for: Youth voting, anti-racism
- Notable work: Bomb the Suburbs

William Wimsatt (born 1972) is an American author and a political and philanthropic organizer. He is the founder of Movement Voter Project, as well as several other organizations, and the author of three books, including Bomb the Suburbs, No More Prisons, and Please Don't Bomb the Suburbs.

== Early life and education ==
Wimsatt was born in Chicago and attended the University of Chicago Laboratory Schools and Kenwood Academy. He attended Oberlin College, but left during his junior year. His father, William C. Wimsatt, is a philosophy of science professor at the University of Chicago.

== Career ==
=== Political activist ===
Wimsatt directs two non-profit organizations, Gamechanger Labs, a new incubator of start-up projects, and Gamechanger Networks, which organizes networks of change-makers such as Vote Mob and Local Power Network. Wimsatt co-founded Rebuild the Dream (along with Natalie Foster and Van Jones), and served as its Partnerships and Political Director. Wimsatt founded the League of Young Voters (2003), TheBallot.org (2004), and co-founded the Generational Alliance (2005) and the Coffee Party (2010). As a philanthropic consultant, he coined the phrase "Cool Rich Kids" (1999) referring to young progressive philanthropists associated with the organization Resource Generation. He has consulted for dozens of organizations including Rock the Vote, MoveOn.org, and Green For All. He was a Fellow at the Movement Strategy Center and the New Organizing Institute, and ran the Ohio Youth Corps in 2008, a joint project of the Ohio Democratic Party and the Obama Campaign. In 2015, Wimsatt founded the Movement Voter Project in Northampton, MA.

=== Writing and editing ===
Wimsatt's first book was Bomb the Suburbs (1994), a collection of essays celebrating urban life and critiquing the suburban mindset. The essay "We Use Words Like Mackadocious", appeared in The Source magazine (May 1993). Wimsatt released No More Prisons (1999), referencing urbanism and the prison-industrial complex, in conjunction with an underground hip-hop album on Raptivism Records. No More Prisons won a 2000 Firecracker Alternative Book Award in the Politics category.

Wimsatt also edited the books Another World is Possible (2001) and Future 500: Youth Organizing and Activism in the United States (2003), Wimsatt co-edited How To Get Stupid White Men Out of Office (2004), a collection of stories from youth organizers around the world who won or swung elections. In 2010 he published the book Please Don't Bomb The Suburbs.
