= James A. Rawley Prize =

The James A. Rawley Prize may refer to:

- James A. Rawley Prize (AHA), a history prize awarded by the American Historical Association (AHA) for the best book in Atlantic history
- James A. Rawley Prize (OAH), a history prize awarded by the Organization of American Historians (OAH) for the best book on race relations in the United States
