= Elizabeth Lunbeck =

American historian

- Education: Duke University; Harvard University
- Occupation: Historian
- Employer: Harvard University

Elizabeth Lunbeck is an American historian. She is Professor of the History of Science in Residence in the Department of the History of Science at Harvard University.

== Books ==
Lunbeck is the author or coauthor of books including:

- The Americanization of Narcissism (2014)
- Family Romance, Family Secrets: Case Notes from an American Psychoanalysis, 1912 (with Bennett Simon, 2003)
- The Psychiatric Persuasion: Knowledge, Gender, and Power in Modern America (1994)

Her edited volumes include:

- Histories of Scientific Observation (edited with Lorraine Daston, 2011)
- Science without Laws: Model Systems, Cases, Exemplary Narratives (edited with Angela Creager and M. Norton Wise, 2007)
- Feminism in Twentieth-Century Science, Technology, and Medicine (edited with Angela Creager and Londa Schiebinger, 2001)

== Awards ==
Her book The Psychiatric Persuasion: Knowledge, Gender, and Power in Modern America (1994) received the 1995 Margaret W. Rossiter History of Women in Science Prize.
