= Joy Harvey =

American historian of science (born 1934)

- Born: Joy Dorothy Harvey; 1934 (age 91–92)
- Education: Harvard University
- Occupation: Historian

Joy Dorothy Harvey (born 1934) is an American historian of science.

== Life ==
Harvey gained a PhD from Harvard University in 1983. She has been an associate editor of the Darwin Correspondence Project, and written a biography of Clémence Royer, Darwin's first French translator. She and Marilyn Bailey Ogilvie collaborated on the multi-volume Biographical Dictionary of Women in Science.

== Works ==
- 'Medicine and politics: Dr. Mary Putnam Jacobi and the Paris Commune', Dialectical anthropology, Vol. 15 (1990), p. 107–117
- l'autre côté du miroir (The Other Side of the Mirror): French Neurophysiology and English Interpretations, in Claude Debru, Jean Gayon and Jean-Francois Picard, eds., Les sciences biologiques et médicales en France, 1920-1950, 1994.
- 'Charles Darwins "Selective strategies": die französische versus die englische Reaktion', Rezeption von Evolutionstheorien im 19. Jahrhundert, 1995, pp.225–61
- Almost a man of genius: Clémence Royer, feminism, and nineteenth-century science. New Brunswick: Rutgers University Press, 1997
- 'History of Science, History and Science, and Natural Science: Undergraduate Teaching of the History of Science at Harvard, 1938-1970', Isis, Vol. 90 (1999), pp.S270-S294.
- (ed. with Marilyn Bailey Ogilvie) The biographical dictionary of women in science: pioneering lives from ancient times to the mid-20th century. New York: Routledge, 2000
- 'Darwin's ‘Angels’: the Women Correspondents of Charles Darwin', in Intellectual History Review, Vol. 19, Issue 2 (2009), pp. 197–210.
