= Iran: From Religious Dispute to Revolution =

1980 book by Michael M.J. Fischer

- First edition
- Author: Michael M. J. Fischer
- Language: English
- Subject: Iranian history, Islam
- Published: 1980 (Harvard University Press)
- Publication place: USA
- Media type: Print (Hardback)
- Pages: 314
- ISBN: 9780674466159
- OCLC: 469917965

Iran: From Religious Dispute to Revolution is a book by scholar Michael M.J. Fischer, written in 1980. The book is about the role of Islam in Iran and its relation to the 1979 Iranian revolution. The book was first published by Harvard University Press in 1980.

== Synopsis ==
The work examines Islam in Iran and its relation to the 1979 Iranian revolution and draws heavily on Fischer's experiences with practitioners in the holy city of Qum. He pays particularly close examination to the Madrasa, which Fischer calls "the scriptural school".

== Reception ==
The work has received reviews from Middle Eastern Studies, Journal of the American Academy of Religion, American Anthropologist, and Political Science Quarterly.
