= Michael M. J. Fischer =

Michael M. J. Fischer is Andrew W. Mellon Professor in the Humanities and Professor of Anthropology and Science and Technology Studies at the Massachusetts Institute of Technology, and Lecturer in the Department of Global Health and Social Medicine, Harvard Medical School.

== Works ==
=== Books ===
- Fischer, Michael M. J. (1973). Zoroastrian Iran Between Myth and Praxis (Ph.D thesis). University of Chicago Press.
- —— (1980). Iran: From Religious Dispute to Revolution. Cambridge, MA: Harvard University Press. ISBN 9780674466159.
- ——; Abedi, Mehdi (1990). Debating Muslims: cultural dialogues in postmodernity and tradition. Madison, Wisconsin: University of Wisconsin Press. ISBN 9780299124342. Details.
- ——; Marcus, George (1999). Anthropology as cultural critique (2nd ed.). Chicago: University of Chicago. ISBN 9780226504506.
- —— (2003). Emergent forms of life and the anthropological voice. Durham, North Carolina: Duke University Press. ISBN 9780822332381. Details.
- —— (2004). Mute dreams, blind owls, and dispersed knowledges: Persian poesis in the transnational circuitry. Durham, North Carolina: Duke University Press. ISBN 9780822332985. Details.
- —— (2009). Anthropological futures. Durham, North Carolina: Duke University Press. ISBN 9780822344766.
- ——; Good, Byron; DelVecchio Good, Mary Jo; Willen, Sarah (2010). A reader in medical anthropology: theoretical trajectories, emergent realities. Malden, Massachusetts: Blackwell. ISBN 9781405183147.
- —— (2018). Anthropology in the meantime : experimental ethnography, theory, and method for the twenty-first century. Durham, North Carolina: Duke University Press. ISBN 9781478000556.

=== Book chapters ===
- Fischer, Michael M. J. (2000), "Calling the future(s) with ethnographic and historiographic legacy disciplines", in Traweek, Sharon; Reid, Roddey (eds.), Doing science + culture, New York: Routledge, pp. 275–322, ISBN 9780415921121

=== Journal articles ===
- Fischer, Michael M. J. (2019), "Anthropological STS in Asia", Annual Review of Anthropology, 45: 181–198, doi:10.1146/annurev-anthro-102215-100258
