= Margaret W. Rossiter History of Women in Science Prize =

Award from the History of Science Society

The Margaret W. Rossiter History of Women in Science Prize is awarded by the History of Science Society for an outstanding book (in odd-numbered years) or article (in even-numbered years) on the history of women in science, published at most four years before the year of the award. It was previously called the Women's Prize, but in 2004 the History of Science Society Council voted unanimously at its annual meeting to rename it the Margaret W. Rossiter History of Women in Science Prize.

== Recipients ==
Year	Winner	Work
1987	Regina Markell Morantz-Sanchez	Sympathy and Science: Women Physicians in American Medicine (Oxford: Oxford University Press, 1985).
1988	Pnina Abir-Am	"Synergy or Clash: Disciplinary and Marital Strategies in the Career of Mathematical Biologist Dorothy Wrinch," in Uneasy Careers and Intimate Lives, edited by Pnina Abir-Am and Dorinda Outram (New Brunswick, N.J.: Rutgers University Press, 1987)
1989	Joan Mark	A Stranger in Her Native Land: Alice Fletcher and the American Indians (Lincoln: University of Nebraska Press, 1988).
1990	Ann Hibner Koblitz	"Science, Women, and the Russian Intelligentsia: The Generation of the 1860s," Isis, 1988, 79: 208–226.
1991	Martha H. Verbrugge	Able-Bodied Womanhood: Personal Health and Social Change in Nineteenth-Century Boston (New York: Oxford University Press, 1988).
1992	Judith Coffin	"Social Science Meets Sweated Labor: Reinterpreting Women's Work in Late Nineteenth-century France", The Journal of Modern History, vol. 63, no. 2, 1991, pp. 230–70.
1993	Barbara Duden	The Woman Beneath the Skin: A Doctor's Patients in Eighteenth-Century Germany (Cambridge, Mass.: Harvard University Press, 1991).
1994	Londa Schiebinger	"Why Mammals Are Called Mammals: Gender Politics in Eighteenth-Century National History", American Historical Review, 1993, 98: 382–411.
1995	Elizabeth Lunbeck	The Psychiatric Persuasion: Knowledge, Gender, and Power in Modern America (Princeton, NJ: Princeton University Press, 1994).
1996	Ida Stamhuis	"A Female Contribution to Early Genetics: Tine Tammes and Mendel's Laws for Continuous Characters", Journal of the History of Biology, 1995, 28: 495–531.
1997	Margaret W. Rossiter	Women Scientists in America: Before Affirmative Action, 1940-1972 (Baltimore: Johns Hopkins University Press, 1995).
1998	Mary Terrall	"Émilie du Chätelet and the Gendering of Science", History of Science, 1995, 33: 283–310.
1999	Linda J. Lear	Rachel Carson: Witness for Nature (Henry Holt and Company, 1997).
2000	Naomi Oreskes	"Objectivity or Heroism? On the Invisibility of Women in Science," Osiris, 1996, 11: 87–113.
2001	Charlotte Furth	A Flourishing Yin: Gender in China’s Medical History, 960-1665 (University of California Press, 1999).
2002	Ruth Oldenziel	"Multiple-Entry Visas: Gender and Engineering in the U.S., 1870-1945," in Crossing Boundaries, Building Bridges: Comparing the History of Women Engineers, 1870s-1990s, eds. Annie Canel, Ruth Oldenziel, and Karin Zachmann (Harwood Academic Publishers, 2000), pp. 11–50.
2003	Ellen Singer More	Restoring the Balance: Women Physicians and the Profession of Medicine, 1850-1995 (Harvard University Press, 2000).
2004	Paula Findlen	"The Scientist's Body: The Nature of Woman Philosopher in Enlightenment Italy" in The Faces of Nature in Enlightenment Europe, (Berlin: Berliner Wissenschafts-Verlag, 2003), pp. 211–236.
2005	Kathleen Broome Williams	Improbable Warriors: Women Scientists and the U.S. Navy in World War II, The Naval Institute Press.
2006	Arleen Tuchman	"Situating Gender", Isis, March 2004, volume 85, no.1.
2007	Katharine Park	Secrets of Women: Gender, Generation, and the Origins of Human Dissection, Zone Books
2008	Sara Stidstone Gronim	"What Jane Knew: A Woman Botanist in the Eighteenth Century", Journal of Women's History 2007, volume 19, no. 3.
2009	Monica H. Green	Making Women's Medicine Masculine. The Rise of Male Authority in Pre-Modern Gynaecology (Oxford University Press, 2008).
2010	Marsha Richmond	"The 'Domestication' of Heredity: The Familial Organization of Geneticists at Cambridge University, 1895-1910" (Journal of the History of Biology, 2006).
2011	Yi-Li Wu	Reproducing Women: Medicine, Metaphor, and Childbirth in Late Imperial China (University of California Press, 2010).
2012	Peter Kastor and Conevery Valencius	"Sacagawea’s Cold: Pregnancy and the Written Record of the Lewis and Clark Expedition", (Bulletin of the History of Medicine, 2008).
2013	Sally Gregory Kohlstedt	Teaching Children Science: Hands-On Nature Study in North America, 1890-1930, (The University of Chicago Press, 2010).
2014	Kimberly A. Hamlin	"The ‘Case of a Bearded Woman’: Hypertrichosis and the Construction of Gender in the Age of Darwin", American Quarterly 63, no. 4 (Dec 2011): 985–81.
2015	Amy Sue Bix	Girls Coming to Tech! A History of American Engineering Education for Women (MIT Press, 2014)
2016	Paola Bertucci	"The In/visible Woman: Mariangela Ardinghelli and the Circulation of Knowledge between Paris and Naples in the Eighteenth Century", Isis, Vol. 104, No. 2 (June 2013), pp. 226–249.
2017	Laura Micheletti Puaca	Searching for Scientific Womanpower: Technocratic Feminism and the Politics of National Security, 1940-1980 (Gender and American Culture) (The University of North Carolina Press, 2014).
2018	Kara Swanson	"Rubbing Elbows and Blowing Smoke: Gender, Class, and Science in the Nineteenth-Century Patent Office", Isis 108, no. 1 (March 2017): 40–61.
2019	Elaine Leong	Recipes and Everyday Knowledge: Medicine, Science, and the Household in Early Modern England, (University of Chicago Press, 2018).
2020	Myrna Perez Sheldon	"Breeding Mixed Race Women for Profit and Pleasure", American Quarterly 71, no. 3 (2019): 741–765.
2021	Sharon Strocchia	Forgotten Healers: Women and the Pursuit of Health in Late Renaissance Italy (Harvard University Press, 2018).
2022	Beans Velocci	"Standards of Care: Uncertainty and Risk in Harry Benjamin's Transsexual Classifications"
2023	Leah DeVun	The Shape of Sex: Nonbinary Gender from Genesis to the Renaissance (Columbia University Press, 2021).
2024	Christoffer Basse Erikson and Xinyi Wen	"Colouring Flower Books, Art, and Experiment in the household of Margery and Henry Power", The British Journal of the History of Science (2023), 56, 21–43.
2025	Alison M. Downham Moore	The French Invention of Menopause and the Medicalisation of Women's Ageing: A History (Oxford University Press, 2022).

== See also ==
- List of general science and technology awards
- List of history awards
- List of science and technology awards for women
- Women in chemistry
- Women in science
