= Packaged Pleasures =

2014 book by Gary S. Cross and Robert N. Proctor

- Author: Gary S. Cross; Robert N. Proctor
- Language: English
- Publisher: University of Chicago Press
- Publication date: September 30, 2014
- Publication place: United States
- Media type: Print, e-book
- Pages: 336
- ISBN: 9780226121277

Packaged Pleasures: How Technology and Marketing Revolutionized Desire is a 2014 nonfiction book written by Gary S. Cross and Robert N. Proctor and published by the University of Chicago Press. It analyzes the history of packaging through a number of case studies and how the rise of capitalism has led to rapid innovation and usage of packages throughout the world in order to satiate people's desire for goods.

== Content ==
The book contains nine chapters, a notes section with references, and an index. Each chapter discusses a specific topic and aspect of packaging and production. The title's subject is addressed in an introductory chapter going over how consumer culture has led to transforming what were once "fleeting and sensory experiences" involving activities and even gifts and transformed them into "transmissible packets of pleasure" with our package-based society. Specific individuals and their inventions are referred to as "pleasure engineers" in the book, owing to how they managed to "optimize sensory pleasure" in their customers. The people discussed include Thomas Edison, John Cadbury, George Eastman, and Walt Disney. Works by authors including Emile Durkheim and Aldous Huxley are referenced to describe how the consuming public has become "hedonistic, self-centered, and only interested in self-gratification".

The second chapter then goes on to focus on pre-history, early civilizations, and the storage of items and foods at the time, along with how foods were preserved in a time period before canning was available. Multiple stories and historical examples are used to describe the first major innovation of "tubularization" and how mass production of packaging began at the end of the 19th century and the Industrial Revolution booming in the 20th century. Packaging for public sale of goods also required the invention of advertising methods and the formation of brand goods. The type of packaging used also had to change over time, moving from the development of large-scale paper production to the use of plastic and other materials.

The chapter on food analyzes how fat and sugar have become commodities of the general public and not just the rich and elite, making them abundant and increasing their negative impact on peoples' health. The process of preservation packaging has also allowed for sweets like candy bars to be sold everywhere and be more preferable to a carrot as a snack. These food options are referred to as "superfoods" or "pseudofoods" in the book because they are packaged and engineered with little nutritional value and highly attractive branded marketing. A chapter on cigarettes describes them as the "quintessential packaged pleasure" thanks to their portable, convenient, and generally cheap design. Other example sensory pleasures used include amusement parks, phonographs, and film and cinema. These discussions also move beyond the history of the United States and include the international sale of goods and how packaging was conducted around the world. The final few chapters cover the rest of the past century and the expanding influence of technology on how packaged goods are bought, sold, and sent to customers, along with the development of powdered foods and the ubiquitous use of square cardboard boxes instead of tubes.

== Critical reception ==
In a review for the journal Technology and Culture, Kathleen Franz approved how the book expands our understanding of the subject via case studies and with a discussion of how issues like obesity, cancer, and overconsumption of resources have affected the world, but agreed with the authors that the book deals with the entirety of its investigation with a lighter general hand despite the case studies because of how quickly it glosses over entire topics. Gastronomica writer Zenia Malmer explained their wishes that the book had been more critical of the ads and other things discussed, along with presenting the consumer's perspective for the products included, but concluded that it was a "good starting point" for those that wish to read and study the history of consumerism. Brent Malin, reviewing for The Journal of American History, criticized the intensification thesis of the book and felt it was not strongly backed up by the case study examples, with the examples of radio and amusement parks stretching the package theme "to the point of losing its utility". He took particular issue with the idea of better music technologies making listening to music more stimulating and thought it was "historically myopic" as an idea, being claimed about many previous technologies including the telegraph.

Food, Culture & Society's Jan Whitaker considered the book "provocative" and that it "holds promise" for driving discussion into new areas in food history research, but was critical of how the authors "back away from judgement" of consumer culture and the idea of a pleasure society. Andrew P. Haley in The American Historical Review called the book "itself a packaged pleasure" that provided a "fresh account" of the history of mass production, though Haley wished the work took a stronger stance against consumerism rather than pushing away concerns over the "democratization of culture". In a review for Times Higher Education, Isabelle Szmigin stated that the book includes a "comprehensive discussion" of the history of consumer goods and that it has a methodical use of references and insight into the history of various products. But the reviewer also questions whether the general idea has a "nagging sense of elitism" that would result in calling for less developed countries to not receive the benefits of consumerization that developed countries already have and if the benefits of decreasing hunger and other problems packaged products have provided were being overlooked.
