= Racial Hygiene: Medicine Under the Nazis =

1988 book by Robert N. Proctor

- First edition cover
- Author: Robert N. Proctor
- Language: English
- Genre: Non-fiction
- Publisher: Harvard University Press
- Publication date: 1988
- Publication place: United States

Racial Hygiene: Medicine Under the Nazis is a non-fiction book by American historian Robert N. Proctor, published in 1988 by Harvard University Press. The author explores the German scientific community's role in forming and implementing the racial policies of Nazi Germany. In his study, Proctor analyzes how Nationalsozialistische Rassenhygiene, National Socialist racial hygiene or “Eugenics” was used to justify racial programs and traces the progression of eugenic methods, such as involuntary euthanasia, within Germany. Racial Hygiene generally received positive reviews for its analysis of medical practitioners’ complicity in Nazi racial doctrine.

== Summary ==
Racial Hygiene discusses the complicity within the German scientific community in formulating racial policies and the National Socialists’ censorship of medical journals, thereby ensuring that “racial hygiene” became considered “normal science”. According to an article in the Comptes rendus de l'Académie des Sciences, the book “destroys the argument that the German scientific community was coerced into participating in Nazi programs”.

Proctor traces the history of eugenics prior to the Nazi Party's rise to power and analyzes how the Nazis incorporated eugenic ideas into their ideology. He demonstrates how theories of racial science imbibed by the Nazis, and the adoption by scientists in turn of Nazi ideology led to large-scale forced sterilization, involuntary euthanasia, and even mass murder. Proctor examines eugenics in the United States, highlighting its sterilization of the mentally ill for espousing a significant influence on racial hygiene in Germany.

The book addresses other aspects of science in Nazi Germany, including efforts to increase the birth rate of ethnic Germans, the preoccupation with health behavior, and resistance within the medical community. Proctor concludes from his research how, in general, Nazism “appealed to academics and intellects”, offering them financial benefits and academic legitimacy.

== Reception ==
A review in Kirkus Reviews noted that the book “revises the idea of Nazis as insane fanatics who perverted science to their devious ends and makes the far more frightening proposition that they were rational, even eminent men, and that Nazi science was deeply rooted in ‘normal’ science”. Professor William E. Seidelman in Comptes rendus de l'Académie des Sciences comments Racial Hygiene is distinct from other works covering the subject because of the book's “broad overview of racial hygiene within the context of prevailing scientific/political values and beliefs”. Commenting on Proctor's “provocative research,” Mary Nolan in The New York Times praises how the book “forces us to reassess the dynamics of Nazism but also challenges pervasive notions about the political neutrality and objective value of science and the moral innocence of scientists”.
