= Robert N. Proctor =

American historian of science (born 1954)

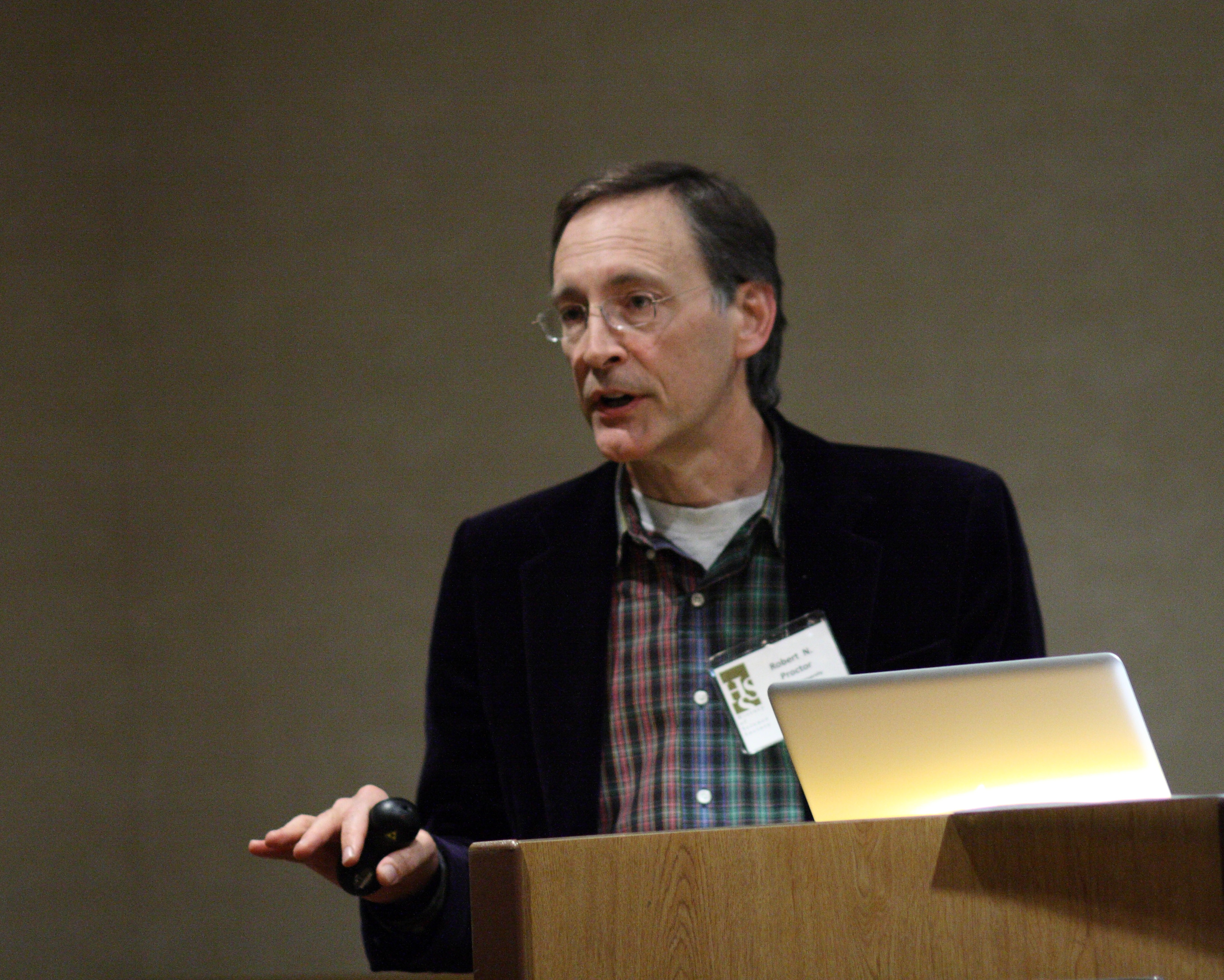
- Proctor in 2009
- Born: June 25, 1954 (age 72); Corpus Christi, Texas, United States
- Education: Indiana University Bloomington
- Occupations: Historian; professor
- Spouse: Londa Schiebinger
- Children: Geoffrey Schiebinger; Jonathan Proctor

Robert Neel Proctor (born 1954) is an American historian of science and Professor of History at Stanford University, where he is also Professor by courtesy of Medicine. While a professor at Pennsylvania State University in 1999, he became the first historian to testify against the tobacco industry.

== Education ==
Robert N. Proctor graduated from Indiana University Bloomington in 1976 with a Bachelor of Science in biology. He then took up studies at Harvard University, earning master's and doctoral degrees in the history of science in 1977 and 1984, respectively.

== Career ==
At Pennsylvania State University, he and his wife, Londa Schiebinger, co-directed the Science, Medicine and Technology in Culture Program for nine years.

Proctor has worked on human origins and the history of evolution, including changing interpretations of the oldest tools. His 1988 book Racial Hygiene: Medicine Under the Nazis, which identified Nazi Germany as an effort to create a biomedical utopia. Adolf Hitler was celebrated as "the doctor of the German people" and physicians joined the Schutzstaffel in greater numbers than any other professional group. Proctor details how racial theorists in Nazi Germany were inspired by eugenicists in the United States, including Madison Grant and Harry H. Laughlin, and how one reason the Nazis mandated sterilization of "the unfit" and anti-miscegenation laws was to prevent the United States from becoming “the world’s racial leader.”

Race was also the focus of his 2003 article "Three Roots of Human Recency", which won the 2004/2005 Award for Exemplary Interdisciplinary Anthropological Research from the American Anthropological Association. In this article he exposes the racism implicit in celebrating "leaving Africa" as a fundamental stage in human evolution; he aims to show that anthropological ideas of human origins, including efforts to answer the question "when did humans become human?", have been scarred by changing notions of race.

His 2008 book Agnotology: The Making and Unmaking of Ignorance, co-edited with Londa Schiebinger, examines the concept of agnotology, a term coined by Iain Boal in 1992 to describe the study of intentionally induced ignorance or doubt, particularly the publication of intentionally inaccurate or misleading scientific data.

His 2012 history of the tobacco industry, Golden Holocaust: Origins of the Cigarette Catastrophe and the Case for Abolition, won the Rachel Carson Prize in 2014. He has also published several articles related to the history of the tobacco industry.

A central theme in Proctor's work is the history of race and racism. In the 1970s, he taught "The changing concept of race" with Nathan Huggins and Barbara Rosenkrantz in the African American Studies department at Harvard University. In 2008, Proctor served as an expert witness in a wrongful death suit against Philip Morris International and used the n-word in his testimony, triggering a mistrial. In 2019, Proctor again drew scrutiny for repeatedly saying the racial slur aloud when quoting from cigarette advertisements in a guest lecture at Stanford Law School. He responded to this backlash with, "I didn't 'use' the N-word in my lecture, I showed and cited its use in three different brands of cigarettes sold in the middle decades of the twentieth century."

== Personal life ==
He is the longtime partner of fellow historian of science Londa Schiebinger, whom he met at Harvard. They have two sons together, named Geoffrey Schiebinger and Jonathan Proctor. Before having children, the couple decided they would have two and each would receive one of their surnames.

== Bibliography ==
=== Books ===
- Proctor, Robert N. (1988). Racial Hygiene: Medicine Under the Nazis. Harvard University Press. ISBN 0-674-74578-7.
- —— (1991). Value-free Science?: Purity and Power in Modern Knowledge. Harvard University Press. ISBN 0-674-93170-X.
- —— (1995). Cancer Wars: How Politics Shapes What We Know and Don't Know about Cancer. New York: BasicBooks. ISBN 0-465-02756-3.
- —— (1999). The Nazi War on Cancer. Princeton University Press. ISBN 0-691-07051-2.
  - —— (2002). Blitzkrieg gegen den Krebs: Gesundheit und Propaganda im Dritten Reich. Stuttgart: Klett-Cotta. ISBN 3-608-91031-X.
- —— (2000). Adolf Butenandt (1903-1995): Nobelpreisträger, Nationalsozialist und MPG-Präsident: Ein erster Blick in den Nachlass. Berlin: Max-Planck-Gesellschaft zur Förderung der Wissenschaften.
- —— (2012). Golden Holocaust: Origins of the Cigarette Catastrophe and the Case for Abolition. University of California Press. ISBN 9780520270169.
- Cross, Gary S.; Proctor, Robert N. (2014). Packaged Pleasures: How Technology and Marketing Revolutionized Desire. University of Chicago Press. ISBN 9780226121277.

=== Selected articles ===
- Proctor, Robert N. (1996). "Nazi medicine and public health policy". Dimensions: A Journal of Holocaust Studies. 10 (2): 29–34.
- Proctor, Robert N. (7 December 1996). "The anti-tobacco campaign of the Nazis: a little known aspect of public health in Germany, 1933–45". BMJ. 313 (7070): 1450–1453. doi:10.1136/bmj.313.7070.1450. PMC 2352989. PMID 8973234.
- Proctor, Robert N. (February 2001). "Commentary: Schairer and Schöniger's forgotten tobacco epidemiology and the Nazi quest for racial purity". International Journal of Epidemiology. 30 (1): 31–34. doi:10.1093/ije/30.1.31.
- Proctor, Robert N. (Fall 2001). "Anti-Agate: The Great Diamond Hoax and the Semiprecious Stone Scam". Configurations. 9 (3): 381–412. doi:10.1353/con.2001.0019.

== Prizes and fellowships ==
- Visiting Fellow, Princeton University Shelby Cullom Davis Center for Historical Studies, 1992
- Research grant, National Human Genome Research Institute, 1992
- Senior Scholar-in-Residence, United States Holocaust Memorial Museum, 1994
- Visiting scholar, Hamburg Institute for Social Research, 1995
- Distinguished Scholar Medal, Pennsylvania State University, 1997
- Fellow, American Academy of Arts and Sciences, 2002

== See also ==
- Tobacco in the United States
