= Marilyn Bailey Ogilvie =

American historian of women in science (born 1936)

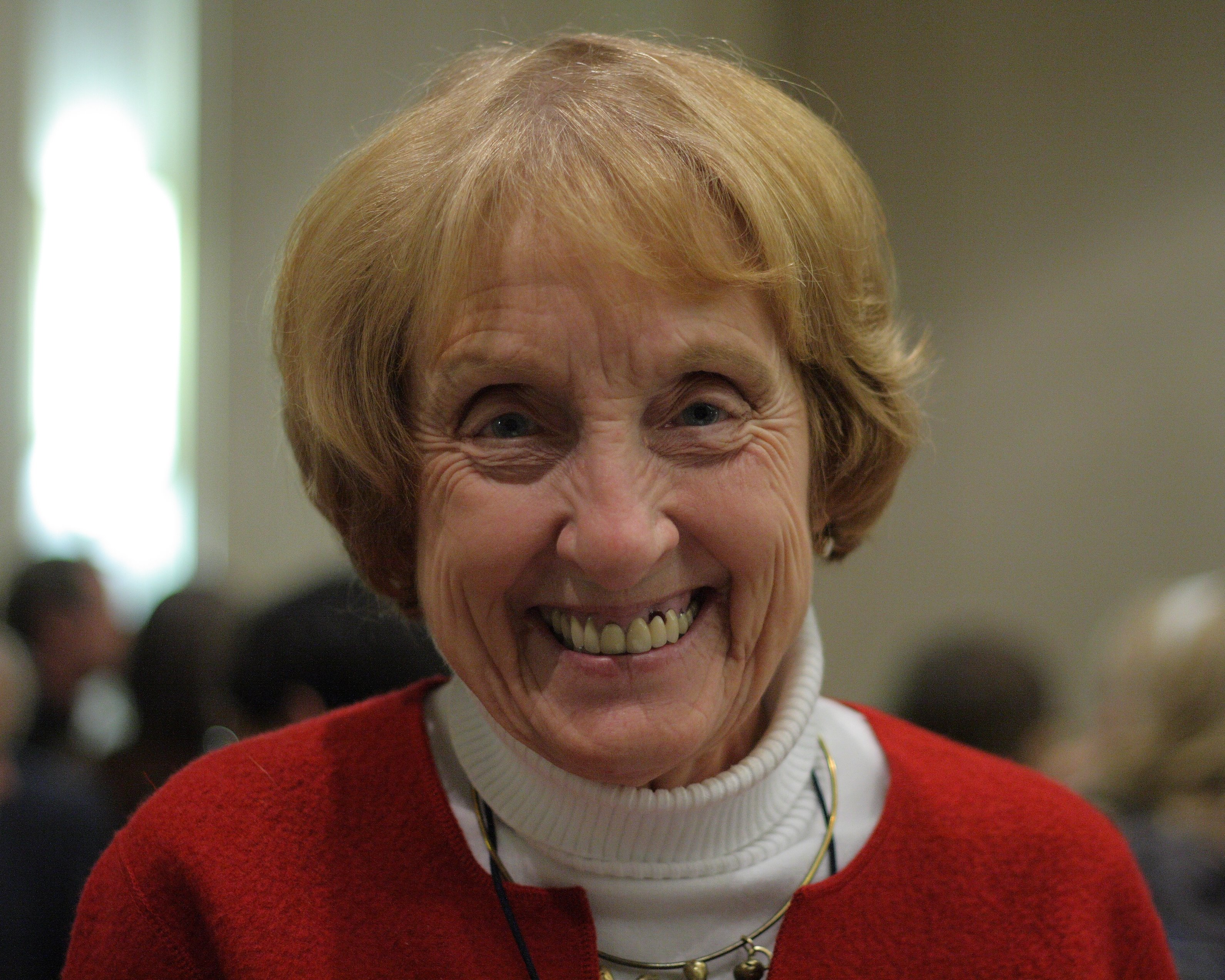
- Ogilvie in 2007
- Born: March 22, 1936 (age 90)
- Education: Baker University (BA 1957); University of Kansas (MA 1959); University of Oklahoma (PhD 1973, MA 1983)
- Spouse: Philip W. Ogilvie (divorced)
- Children: 3
- Scientific career
- Fields: Historian of science
- Institutions: Oklahoma Baptist University (1979–1991); University of Oklahoma (1991–2008)

Marilyn Bailey Ogilvie (born March 22, 1936) is an American historian of science known especially for her work on the history of women in science. She taught at Oklahoma Baptist University before becoming curator of the History of Science Collections and professor at the University of Oklahoma. She is currently Curator Emeritus, History of Science Collections and Professor Emeritus, Department of the History of Science at the university.

== Early life and education ==
Ogilvie was born on March 22, 1936. She earned an A.B. degree in Biology from Baker University (1957), an M.A. in Zoology from the University of Kansas (1959), and a Ph.D. in the History of Science (1973) and an M.A. in Library Science (1983) from the University of Oklahoma.

== Career ==
After working as an associate professor and division chair at Oklahoma Baptist University from 1979 to 1991, Ogilvie returned to the University of Oklahoma as the Curator of the History of Science Collections. As curator, she expanded the holdings of the collection from 79,000 to 94,000 volumes. After her retirement in 2008, a fellowship for graduate studies in the History of Science was established in her name. She is currently Curator Emeritus, History of Science Collections, and Professor Emeritus, Department of the History of Science, at the university.

Ogilvie's books reflect her interest in the history of women in science. In addition to biographical dictionaries, she has written biographies of biologist Alice Middleton Boring, physicist and chemist Marie Curie, astronomer Caroline Herschel and ornithologist Margaret Morse Nice.

In 1998, her book Women in Science: Antiquity through the Nineteenth Century was listed in the American Library Association Outstanding Reference Sources. The book, which contains profiles of 186 women, was described by Chet Raymo of The Boston Globe as follows: "What comes across is the great love of doing science that many women have shared with men. What is also apparent are the formidable barriers that have been thrown up against them."

This theme was taken up again in Marie Curie: A Biography (2004; paperback edition 2011), in which Ogilvie discusses Marie Curie's partnership with her husband Pierre Curie. She also describes their individual contributions to the discoveries for which they jointly received the 1903 Nobel Prize in Physics, and Marie received the 1911 Nobel Prize in Chemistry.

Ogilvie's books are currently held by hundreds of libraries around the world.

She was honored on the occasion of her 80th birthday at the Annual Meeting of the History of Science Society in November 2016 as a "leading historian of women in science." According to her colleague Pnina Abir-Am of the Women's Studies Research Center at Brandeis University, Ogilvie, through her work on biographical dictionaries of women in science, was instrumental in drawing attention to the sheer number of women in scientific fields throughout history.

== Personal life ==
Ogilvie was married to Philip W. Ogilvie, who taught zoology at the University of Oklahoma and served as director of the Oklahoma City Zoo and other zoos. The couple co-authored at least one scholarly article. They had three children and later divorced.

== Publications ==
The following is a selection of Ogilvie's publications:

- Ogilvie, Marilyn (2021). Marie Curie: A Reference Guide to her Life and Works. Lanham, Maryland: Rowman & Littlefield. ISBN 978-1-5381-3001-8
- Ogilvie, Marilyn Bailey (2018). For the Birds: American Ornithologist Margaret Morse Nice. Norman: University of Oklahoma Press. ISBN 978-0-8061-6069-6
- Ogilvie, Marilyn B. (2008). Searching the Stars: The Story of Caroline Herschel. Gloucestershire, UK: The History Press. ISBN 978-0752442778
- Ogilvie, Marilyn Bailey (2004). Marie Curie: A Biography. Westport, CN: Greenwood Press. ISBN 978-0-313-32529-8.
- Ogilvie, Marilyn; Harvey, Joy (2000). The Biographical Dictionary of Women in Science: Pioneering Lives from Ancient Times to the mid-20th Century. New York: Routledge. ISBN 978-0-415-92038-4.
- Ogilvie, Marilyn Bailey (1999). A Dame Full of Vim and Vigor: A Biography of Alice Middleton Boring, Biologist in China. Amsterdam: Harwood Academic. ISBN 978-90-5702-575-4.
- Ogilvie, Marilyn (1986). Women in Science: Antiquity through the Nineteenth Century: A Biographical Dictionary with Annotated Bibliography. Cambridge, MA: MIT Press. ISBN 978-0-262-15031-6.
