= Paula Findlen =

American Italian historian

Paula E. Findlen (born 1964) is the Ubaldo Pierotti Professor of Italian History, the director of the Suppes Center for the History and Philosophy of Science and Technology, and the director of the SIMILE Program, all at Stanford University.

Findlen received a bachelor's degree in medieval and renaissance studies from Wellesley College in 1984. She then pursued graduate studies at the University of California, Berkeley, and earned a master's degree in history in 1985 and a Ph.D. in 1989.

Her book titled Possessing Nature: Museums, Collecting, and Scientific Culture in Early Modern Italy (1995) was given the Pfizer Award in 1996 by the History of Science Society. Her article "The Scientist's Body: The Nature of Woman Philosopher in Enlightenment Italy", in The Faces of Nature in Enlightenment Europe, (Berlin: Berliner Wissenschafts-Verlag, 2003), pp. 211–236, received the 2004 Margaret W. Rossiter History of Women in Science Prize from the History of Science Society.

In 2016, Findlen gave the inaugural Rosalinde and Arthur Gilbert Lecture on the history of collecting, at London V&A. That same year, she also received the Premio Galileo prize, an annual, international award for contributions to understanding Italian culture.

== Selected publications ==
- Possessing Nature: Museums, Collecting, and Scientific Culture in Early Modern Italy
- Mapping the Republic of Letters, with Caroline Winterer, Giovanna Ceserani

and Dan Edelstein

- Early Modern Things: Objects and their Histories, 1500-1800
- Gusto for Things
- "Why Go to Grad School?"
