= George E. Marcus =

American anthropologist (born 1946)

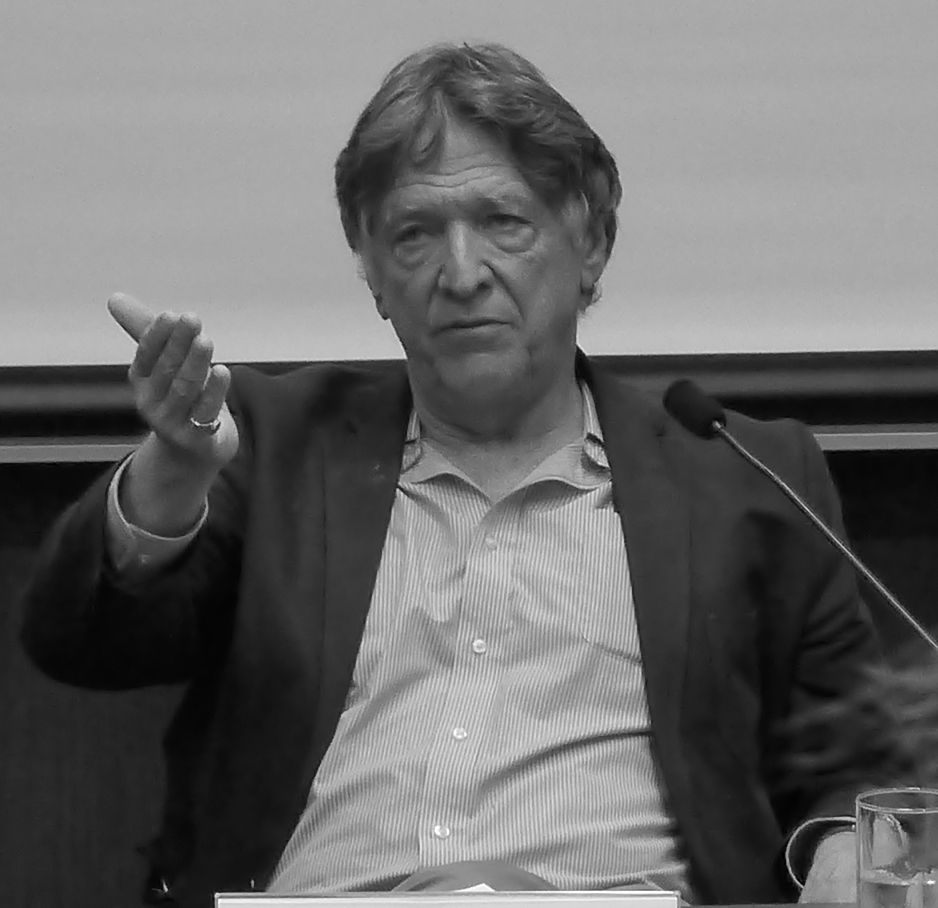
- George E. Marcus during a conference at Pontificia Universidad Católica del Perú
- Born: Brownsville, Pennsylvania
- Education: Yale University; Harvard University
- Occupation: Anthropologist
- Known for: Founding the Cultural Anthropology journal, postmodern anthropology, ethnographic studies
- Spouse: Patricia Seed
- Children: 2

George Emanuel Marcus is an American professor of anthropology at the University of California, Irvine who focuses on the anthropology of elites.

== Education and life ==
Marcus received a B.A. from Yale University in 1968 and a Ph.D. from Harvard in 1976. He spent the 1982–83 academic year at the Institute for Advanced Study at Princeton, where he came up with the idea for Anthropology as Cultural Critique, which he co-wrote with Michael M. J. Fischer and published in 1986 (a second edition was later published in 1999).

Afterwards, he served as the Joseph D. Jamail Professor at Rice University, where he chaired the anthropology department for 25 years. He currently holds the position of Chancellor's Professor at the University of California, Irvine, where he established a Center for Ethnography, devoted to experiments and innovations in this form of inquiry.

He is married to the historian Patricia Seed, a historian who specializes in cartography and also teaches as a professor at UC Irvine. They have two children.

== Academic research ==
Marcus has studied "elites"—people with a great amount of social power. He has researched and written about nobility in Tonga, an upper-class group with family fortunes in Galveston, Texas, and a Portuguese nobleman. In two books, Writing Culture and Anthropology as Cultural Critique, he argues that anthropologists typically frame their thoughts according to their own social, political, and literary history, and are inclined to study people with less power and status than themselves.

Marcus pushed anthropology to pay greater attention to the modern world's influence on communities once regarded as isolated. He advocated new research methods to reflect this contemporary focus, including how a community changes and disperses around the world. In the 1980s, most anthropologists studied people who had lived in the same location for hundreds of years, with a narrow focus on longstanding local traditions. Today, an anthropologist interested in the people of Samoa, for example, would likely not only study life in the Samoan Islands, but also Samoan communities in New Zealand, Hawaii, and California.

Marcus's current research focuses on institutions of great power, and their connections and consequences for ordinary people. Working with anthropologist Douglas R. Holmes, he applies an anthropological research approach to people's thought- and decision-making processes in the operation of central banks in the United States and Europe.

== Publications ==
He founded Cultural Anthropology, the Society for Cultural Anthropology's academic journal of repute, and was the editor of the University of Chicago Press's Late Editions: Cultural Studies for the End of the Century, an eight-volume series of annuals published in the 1990s that documented "unsettling dilemmas and unprecedented challenges facing cultural studies on the brink of the twenty-first century". The series covered a range of subjects, including the Internet, conspiracy theories, documentaries, nuclear weapons, environmental politics, artificial intelligence, and cryonics.

=== Late Editions ===
- Connected: Engagements with Media (Editor, Late Editions: Cultural Studies for the End of the Century, Chicago: University of Chicago Press, 1996)
- Corporate Futures: The Diffusion of the Culturally Sensitive Corporate Form (Editor, Late Editions: Cultural Studies for the End of the Century, Chicago: University of Chicago Press, 1998)
- Cultural Producers In Perilous States: Editing Events, Documenting Change (Editor, Late Editions: Cultural Studies for the End of the Century, Chicago: University of Chicago Press, 1997)
- Para-Sites: A Casebook against Cynical Reason (Editor, Late Editions: Cultural Studies for the End of the Century, Chicago: University of Chicago Press, 2000)
- Paranoia within Reason: A Casebook on Conspiracy as Explanation (Editor, Late Editions: Cultural Studies for the End of the Century, Chicago: University of Chicago Press, 1999)
- Perilous States: Conversations on Culture, Politics, and Nation (Editor, Late Editions: Cultural Studies for the End of the Century, Chicago: University of Chicago Press, 1994)
- Technoscientific Imaginaries: Conversations, Profiles, and Memoirs (Editor, Late Editions: Cultural Studies for the End of the Century, Chicago: University of Chicago Press, 1994)
- Zeroing In on the Year 2000: The Final Edition (Editor, Late Editions: Cultural Studies for the End of the Century, Chicago: University of Chicago Press, 2000)

=== Other publications ===
- Marcus, George E. (February 1988). "Parody and the Parodie in Polynesian Cultural History". Cultural Anthropology. 3 (1). American Anthropological Association: 68–76. doi:10.1525/can.1988.3.1.02a00060.
- Marcus, George E. (October 1995). "Ethnography in/of the World System: the Emergence of Multi-sited Ethnography". Annual Review of Anthropology. 24: 95–117. doi:10.1146/annurev.an.24.100195.000523.
- Anthropology as Cultural Critique: An Experimental Moment in the Human Sciences (2 ed.). Chicago, IL: University of Chicago Press. 1999. ISBN 978-0226504506. (with Michael M. J. Fischer)
- Ethnography Through Thick and Thin. Princeton, NJ: Princeton University Press. 1998. ISBN 9780691002538.
