= Marsha Richmond =

American historian of science

Marsha Leigh Richmond is an American historian of science and a professor at Wayne State University, where she is known for her work on history of women in science. In 2020 she was elected as a fellow of the American Association for the Advancement of Science.

== Work ==
Richmond joined Wayne State University in 1994 and as of 2024 continues to work there as a professor. During her time at Wayne State, she focused on research for the entry of women into science between 1900 and 1940. Richmond has studied genetics as well as a focus on Darwin with evolution. Her work allowed us further insight into history of men and women studying biology that occurred within the 1900s. Also an author, Richmond's newest project is titled “Women in Science: The Case of Genetics, 1900-1940” and offers an international comparison of the experiences of women who worked in genetics from 1900 (with the rediscovery of Mendel's work) until the 1940s.

== Awards ==
In 2010, she received the Margaret W. Rossiter History of Women in Science Prize from the History of Science Society for her article "The 'Domestication' of Heredity: The Familial Organization of Geneticists at Cambridge University, 1895-1910" (Journal of the History of Biology, 2006). In 2020, she was elected the 2020 Fellow of the American Association for the Advancement of Science (AAAS).
