= Regina Morantz-Sanchez =

American historian

Regina Markell Morantz-Sanchez is an American historian, and professor at University of Michigan.

== Early life and education ==
She graduated from Barnard College in 1965 and a Ph.D. from Columbia University in 1971.

== Awards ==
- 1987 Margaret W. Rossiter History of Women in Science Prize for Sympathy and Science: Women Physicians in American Medicine
- 1999 Research Award, from Institute for Research on Women and Gender

== Works ==
- In Her Own Words: Oral Histories of Women Physicians, Greenwood Publishing Group, 1982, ISBN 978-0-313-22686-1; 1985.
- Sympathy and Science: Women Physicians in American Medicine, Oxford University Press, 1985, ISBN 978-0-19-503627-5; UNC Press, 2000, ISBN 978-0-8078-4890-6
- Conduct Unbecoming a Woman: Medicine on Trial in Turn of the Century Brooklyn, Oxford University Press US, 2000, ISBN 978-0-19-513928-0
- "The Female Student has Arrived", Send us a lady physician: women doctors in America, 1835-1920, Editor Ruth J. Abram, W. W. Norton & Company, 1985, ISBN 978-0-393-30278-3
- "The Connecting Link: The Case for the Woman Doctor in 19th-Century America", Sickness and health in America: readings in the history of medicine and public health, Editors Judith Walzer Leavitt, Ronald L. Numbers, University of Wisconsin Press, 1997, ISBN 978-0-299-15324-3
