= Kara W. Swanson =

Professor

Kara Weatherlee Swanson
- Education: Yale University, BS (1987); University of California, Berkeley, MA (1988); University of California, Berkeley, JD (1992); Harvard University, PhD (2009)
- Scientific career
- Fields: intellectual property law, property, gender and sexuality, race and racism, the history of science, medicine, and technology, and legal history
- Thesis: Body banks : a history of milk banks, blood banks, and sperm banks in the United States (2009)
- Doctoral advisor: Allan Brandt

Kara W. Swanson is a professor at Northeastern University School of Law. She is known for her work as a legal practitioner who works in intersections of gender and sexuality, property law, race and racism, and the history of science, medicine, and technology.

== Education ==
Swanson trained as a biochemist and molecular biologist during her undergraduate studies at Yale University, graduating with a bachelor of science in 1987. She then earned her master's degree and Juris Doctor at the University of California at Berkeley in 1988 and 1992, respectively. She then earned her Ph.D. in the History of Science from Harvard University in 2009.

== Career ==
From 1992 until 1993 Swanson was a clerk for William H. Orrick Jr. and then from 1993 until 1994 she clerked for Cecil F. Poole. From 1994 until 2004 she worked at the law firm Dechert. She was the Berger-Howe Fellow in Legal History at Harvard Law School from 2008 until 2009 when she joined Drexel University School of Law as an associate professor. In 2015 she moved to Northeastern School of Law.

She is a current member of the School of Historical Studies at the Institute for Advanced Study in Princeton, NJ. She was also selected as the 2020 Arthur Molella Distinguished Fellow by the Lemelson Center for the Study of Invention and Innovation at the Smothsonian Museum of American History to support her project, “Inventing Citizens: Race, Gender, and Patents.”

Her work includes an examination of the human body as property.

== Selected publications ==
- Swanson, Kara W. (2009). "The Emergence of the Professional Patent Practitioner". Technology and Culture. 50 (3): 519–548. doi:10.1353/tech.0.0298. ISSN 1097-3729.
- Swanson, Kara W. (2014-05-19). Banking on the Body. Cambridge, Massachusetts: Harvard University Press. ISBN 978-0-674-28143-1.
- Swanson, Kara W. (2015–2016). "Intellectual Property and Gender: Reflections on Accomplishments and Methodology". American University Journal of Gender, Social Policy & the Law. 24: 175.
- Swanson, Kara W. (2020). "RACE AND SELECTIVE LEGAL MEMORY: REFLECTIONS ON INVENTION OF A SLAVE". Columbia Law Review. 120 (4): 1077–1118. ISSN 0010-1958. JSTOR 26915807.

== Honors and awards ==
Swanson received the 2007 Joan Cahalin Robinson Prize from the Society for the History of Technology.

She received the 2018 Margaret W. Rossiter History of Women in Science Prize from the History of Science Society for her article "Rubbing Elbows and Blowing Smoke: Gender, Class, and Science in the Nineteenth-Century Patent Office", Isis 108, no. 1 (March 2017): 40–61.

In 2021, her essay "Race and Selective Legal Memory: Reflections on 'Invention of a Slave'" earned the John Hope Franklin Prize from the Law & Society Association.

In 2022, Swanson was awarded the Martha Trescott Prize from the Society of the History of Technology.
