= Patricia Seed =

American historian

- Education: University of Wisconsin-Madison
- Occupations: Historian, professor
- Spouse: George Marcus
- Children: Rachel, Avery

Patricia Seed is an American historian and professor in the University of California, Irvine's Department of History. She specializes in the history of cartography and navigation, and is the foremost authority on latitude as it relates to the historical use of maps in maritime exploration.

== Education and life ==
Professor Seed received her Ph.D. from the University of Wisconsin-Madison. After spending two decades as a history professor at Rice University, she moved to the faculty of the University of California, Irvine, in 2005. She lives with her husband, anthropologist George Marcus, with whom she has two children, Rachel and Avery.

== Research ==
Her specialities include history of the early modern and colonial European eras, especially in relation to Spanish and Portuguese-speaking cultures.

Specifically, her fields of interest include history of cartography, comparative history of cartographic design and navigation, large-scale coastal mapping (e.g., Africa, 15th century), Mercator projection, historical applications of GIS to portolan charts, Shuttle Radar Topography Mission GIS data, effect of rising sea levels on West Africa, and Jewish and Islamic influences on the political construction of Latin America.

=== Books ===
She published To Love, Honor, and Obey in Colonial Mexico: Conflicts over Marriage Choice, 1574–1821 in 1992, and Ceremonies of Possession in Europe's Conquest of the New World, 1492–1640 in 1995,

In 2001 she published American Pentimento: The Invention of Indians and the Pursuit of Riches, and a year later she was awarded the American Historical Association's James A. Rawley Prize in Atlantic History.

== See also ==
- History of cartography
