= Barbara Duden =

German historian (born 1942)

- Born: August 27, 1942 (age 83); Greifswald
- Occupations: Medical historian, Scholar

Barbara Duden (born August 27, 1942, in Greifswald) is a German medical historian, scholar of gender studies, and emeritus professor of the University of Hannover. Her work figures significantly in the currents that established the body as a site for historical inquiry. She is one of the founders of the journal Courage, which was in publication from 1976 to 1984. Courage primarily circulated in West Berlin where it played an extensive role in informing the women's movement at the time. Her father is also the great-grandson of the German philologist Konrad Duden.

== Bibliography ==
- Geschichte unter der Haut. Ein Eisenacher Arzt und seine Patientinnen um 1730. Klett-Cotta, Stuttgart 1987, ISBN 3-608-93113-9.

- The Woman Beneath the Skin. A doctor's patients in eighteenth-century Germany. Aus dem Deutschen von Thomas Dunlap. Harvard University Press, Cambridge, MA/ London 1991, ISBN 0-674-95403-3.

- Der Frauenleib als öffentlicher Ort. Vom Mißbrauch des Begriffs Leben. (= Luchterhand Essay Band 9). Luchterhand, Hamburg 1991, ISBN 3-630-87109-7.

- Disembodying Women. Perspectives on pregnancy and the unborn. Aus dem Deutschen von Lee Hoinacki. Harvard University Press, Cambridge/London 1993, ISBN 0-674-21267-3.

- Auf den Spuren des Körpers in einer technogenen Welt. VS Verlag Fur Sozialwissenschaften 2002, ISBN 9783810033109.

== Awards ==
Her book The Woman Beneath the Skin. A doctor's patients in eighteenth-century Germany received the 1993 Margaret W. Rossiter History of Women in Science Prize.
