= Londa Schiebinger =

American historian (born 1952)

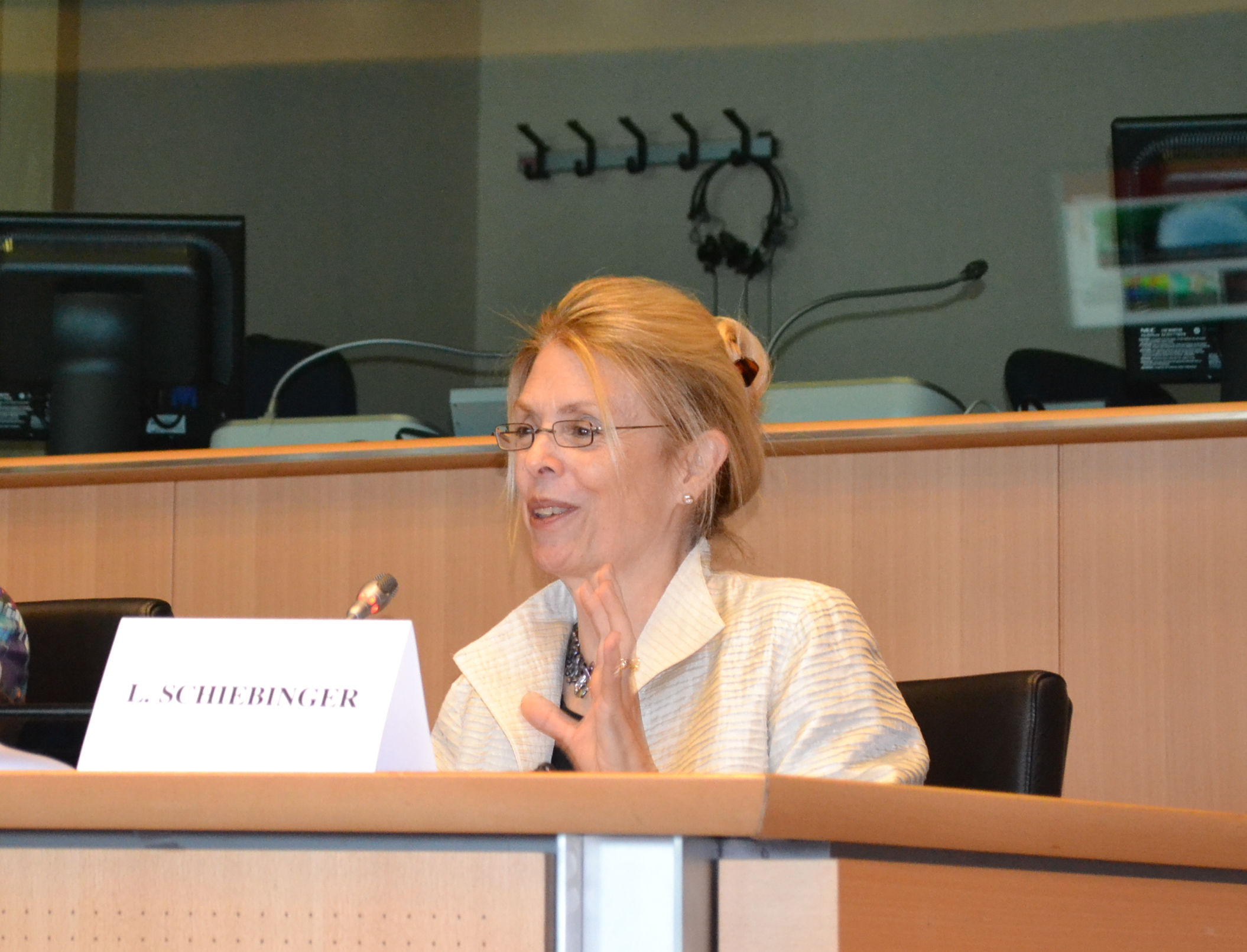
- Londa Schiebinger presenting the Gendered Innovations Project at the European Parliament.
- Born: May 13, 1952 (age 74)
- Known for: Gendered Innovations in Science, Medicine, Engineering, and Environment
- Awards: Humboldt Research Award (1998); James A. Rawley Prize (2005)

Academic background
- Education: Harvard University
- Thesis: Women and the origins of modern science (1984)

Academic work
- Institutions: Stanford University
- Notable works: The Mind has no Sex? Women in the Origins of Modern Science (1989); Nature’s Body: Gender in the Making of Modern Science (1993); Plants and Empire: Colonial Bioprospecting in the Atlantic World (2007)

Londa Schiebinger (/ˈʃiːbɪŋər/ SHEE-bing-ər; born May 13, 1952) is the John L. Hinds Professor of History of Science at Stanford University. She received her Ph.D. from Harvard University in 1984. She is the founding director of Stanford's Gendered Innovations in Science, Health & Medicine, Engineering, and Environment project. Schiebinger is an elected member of the American Academy of Arts and Sciences and has received honorary doctorates from the Vrije Universiteit Brussel (2013), Lund University (2017), and Universitat de València (2018). She was the first woman in the field of history to win the Humboldt Research Award in 1998. She won the Centennial Medal from Harvard University’s Griffin Graduate School of Arts and Sciences in 2026.

Schiebinger has analyzed what she calls the three “fixes”: "Fix the Numbers of Women" focuses on increasing the underrepresented groups participating in science and engineering; "Fix the Institutions" promotes structural change for equity in research organizations; and "Fix the Knowledge" (or "gendered innovations") integrates sex, gender, and intersectional analysis into research design. As a result of this work, she was recruited to direct Stanford University's Clayman Institute for Gender Research, a post she held from 2004 to 2010. In 2010 and 2014, she presented the keynote address and wrote the conceptual background paper for the United Nations' Expert Group Meeting on Gender, Science, and Technology. Again in 2022, she prepared the background paper for the United Nations 67th session of the Commission on the Status of Women's priority theme, about using technology to achieve gender equity and female empowerment.

In 2013, she presented the Gendered Innovations project at the European Parliament. Gendered Innovations was also presented to the South Korean National Assembly in 2014. In 2015, Schiebinger addressed 600 participants from 40 countries on Gendered Innovations at the Gender Summit 6—Asia Pacific. Her work was presented in a Palace Symposium for the King and Queen of the Netherlands at the Royal Palace of Amsterdam in 2017. In 2018–2020, she led a European Commission Expert Group to produce the policy review Gendered Innovations 2: How Inclusive Analysis Contributes to Research and Innovation.

Schiebinger's work is interdisciplinary. In recognition of her creative work across academic fields of research, she was awarded the Interdisciplinary Leadership Award from the Stanford University School of Medicine in 2010, the Linda Pollin Women's Heart Health Leadership Award from the Cedars-Sinai Medical Center in 2015, the Impact of Gender/Sex on Innovation and Novel Technologies Pioneer Award in 2016, and the American Medical Women's Association President's Recognition Award in 2017. She has held fellowships at the Max Planck Institute for the History of Science (1999–2000) and at the Stanford Humanities Center (2010–2011, 2017–2018, 2022–2023). She served as an advisor to the Berlin University Alliance from 2022 to 2023.

== Major works ==
=== Gendered Innovations in Science, Health & Medicine, Engineering, and Environment (2009–) ===
Schiebinger coined the term “gendered innovations” in 2005. In 2009, she launched Gendered Innovations in Science, Health & Medicine, Engineering, and Environment, a project at Stanford University. Gendered Innovations has developed case studies and practical methods of sex, gender, and intersectional analysis for STEM. The project was joined by the European Commission in 2011 and by the U.S. National Science Foundation in 2012. Gendered Innovations received funding from the European Commission again in 2018 and from the National Science Foundation in 2019. This project has brought together international natural scientists, engineers, and gender experts in a series of collaborative workshops. The project served as the intellectual foundations for the “gender dimension in research” requirements in the European Commission's Horizon 2020 funding framework. The Center for Gendered Innovations in Science and Technology Research was founded in Seoul in 2016 and the Institute for Gendered Innovation was created at Ochanomizu University in Tokyo in 2022.

One notable case study came in 2012, when the Gendered Innovations team discovered that Google Translate defaults to the masculine pronoun because “he said” is more commonly found on the web than “she said.” When trained on historical data (as Google Translate is), the system inherits bias (including gender bias). Past bias is perpetuated into the future, even when governments, universities, and companies have implemented policies to foster equality.

Schiebinger has also worked to create infrastructure for gender-responsive science across funding agencies, journals, and universities. She advises funding agencies, including the German Research Foundation and the U.S. National Science Foundation, on policies for integrating sex, gender, and diversity analysis into research. She and colleagues published guidelines for editors of medical journals to evaluate sex and gender analysis in manuscripts submitted for publication. She also seeks to help universities integrate social analysis into core natural science and engineering curricula. She advises industry on developing products that meet the needs of diverse user groups.

=== Has Feminism Changed Science? (1999) ===
Schiebinger's book Has Feminism Changed Science? is split into three sections: "Women in Science", "Gender in the Cultures of Science", and "Gender in the Substance of Science". Throughout the book, she describes the factors that led to gender inequality in science, including how the private sphere is seen as the domain of women and public sphere as for men. She also discusses how an increase in the number of women in the field will not itself change the culture of that field. The construction of gender and science is a cycle, in that ideas of gender can inform what evidence people look for or areas they choose to study, and that whatever is found then influences theories of gender.

The first of the book's three sections takes a look at the impacts of some of the first women to be known to have participated in science, such as Christine de Pizan and Marie Curie. The section also examines the numerical count of women in the various fields of science in the late 20th century United States, as well as looking at the breakdown of other factors, such as pay rates and the level of degree held, in relation to gender. The section goes on to theorize that the cultural reinforcement of gender roles may play a factor as to why there are fewer women in science.

The second section, "Gender in the Cultures of Science", argues that science has been gendered as masculine and that women report a distaste for the excessive competition fostered by academic science. The section also argues that the splitting of gender roles in personal life, where women still take on a majority of domestic responsibilities, may hinder women in scientific fields from accomplishing more.

The third section of the book, "Gender in the Substance of Science", details the perspectives that women have brought to fields such as medicine, primatology, archeology, biology, and physics. Schiebinger states that as of the writing of the book, women earn nearly 80 percent of all Ph.D.s in primatology, and yet, despite this, having a large number of women scientists in the field has not led to a change in the assumptions or culture of science.

=== The Mind Has No Sex? Women in the Origins of Modern Science (1989) ===
Using a theory coined by François Poullain de la Barre, this book focuses on the eighteenth-century history of science and medicine. The Mind Has No Sex? is one of the first scholarly works to investigate women and gender in the origins of modern Western science. It exposes the myths of the natural body and of value-neutral knowledge. Schiebinger demonstrates how science's claim to objectivity renders women's exclusion from science invisible and makes this exclusion appear fair.

She argues that women were ready and willing to take their place in science in the early modern period. Schiebinger first identifies these women and the structures of early modern European society that allowed them a place in science. Of note is her work on German women working in guild-like sciences—Maria Sibylla Merian and Maria Margarethe Winkelmann. Winkemann applied to be the astronomer of the Prussian Academy of Sciences when her husband died in 1710. Despite the philosopher Gottfried Wilhelm Leibniz’s support, she was rejected.

The best-known part of this book is Schiebinger's chapter on “Skeletons in the Closet”, where she tells the story of the first illustrations of female skeletons in European anatomy. Schiebinger argues that it was an attempt to define the position of women (especially white middle-class women) in European society that spawned the first representations of the female skeleton. Debate arose over the strengths and weakness of these female skeletons, focusing in particular on depictions of the skull as a measure of intelligence and pelvis as a measure of womanliness. After the 1750s, the anatomy of sex difference provided a foundation upon which to build natural relations between the sexes. The seemingly superior build of the male body (and mind) was cited to justify its social role. At the same time, the particularities of the female body justified its natural role as wife and mother.

The book has been translated into Japanese, German, Chinese, Portuguese, Spanish, and Greek.

=== Nature's Body: Gender in the Making of Modern Science (1993) ===
This book focuses on how knowledge is gendered. It explores how gender structured important aspects of the content of early modern science, with case studies exploring the sexing of plants, the gender politics of taxonomies and nomenclatures, the gendering of apes, and the agency ascribed to women in shaping racial characters. Her chapter “The Private Lives of Plants” focuses on Carl Linnaeus and how his taxonomies contributed to naturalizing the role of women in modern culture. Plant sexuality was strongly assimilated to heterosexual models of human affection, even though the majority of the flowers are hermaphroditic. Schiebinger reveals how Linnaean taxonomy recapitulated social hierarchies by setting the taxon defined by male stamens above that defined by female pistils.

Best known is her chapter “Why Mammals are Called Mammals”, recounting the history of the breast in eighteenth-century Europe. This chapter zeroes in on how notions of gender formed scientific taxonomies, and how these taxonomies buttressed gender roles in science and society. By emphasizing how natural it is for females—both human and nonhuman—to suckle their children, Linnaeus's newly coined Mammalia helped to legitimize the restructuring of European society in an age of cultural upheaval and revolution.

This book also contains chapters on the eighteenth-century origins of scientific studies of sex and race, and their relation to questions about who should be included and excluded from newly emerging scientific institutions.

Nature's Body won the 1995 Ludwik Fleck Prize from the Society for Social Studies of Science, and the chapter “Why Mammals are Called Mammals” was featured on the cover of The American Historical Review and won the 1994 Margaret W. Rossiter History of Women in Science Prize from the History of Science Society.

=== Plants and Empire: Colonial Bioprospecting in the Atlantic World (2004) ===
Schiebinger published Plants and Empire in 2004. Developing a new methodology, agnotology (defined as the cultural history of ignorance), she explores the movement, triumph, suppression, and extinction of diverse knowledges in the course of eighteenth-century encounters between Europeans and the inhabitants of the Caribbean—both Indigenous peoples and African slaves. Schiebinger explores the nontransfer of important bodies of knowledge from the New World into Europe.

Schiebinger tells the story of Maria Sibylla Merian, one of the few European women to voyage for science in the eighteenth century. In a passage in her 1705 Metamorphosis insectorum Surinamensium, Merian recorded how the Indian and African slave populations in Suriname, then a Dutch colony, used the seeds of a plant she identified as the flos pavonis as an abortifacient to abort their children so they would not become slaves as well. This book reveals how gender relations in Europe and its West Indian colonies influenced what European bioprospectors collected—and failed to collect—as they encountered the knowledge traditions of the Caribbean. Abortifacients were a body of knowledge that did not circulate freely between the West Indies and Europe.

This book won the James A. Rawley Prize from the American Historical Association and the Alf Andrew Heggoy Book Prize from the French Colonial Historical Society in 2005. The chapter “Feminist History of Colonial Science" was republished in Hypatia in 2004 and won the J. Worth Estes Prize from the American Association for the History of Medicine in 2005.

=== Secret Cures of Slaves: People, Plants, and Medicine in the Eighteenth-Century Atlantic World (2017) ===
This book explores the eighteenth-century background of human medical experimentation, in particular asking if the large populations of enslaved people, concentrated on American plantations, were used as human research subjects.

A major finding of Secret Cures of Slaves is that, in many instances, European physicians in the British and French West Indies did not use enslaved people as research subjects. Enslaved laborers were considered valuable property of powerful plantation owners whom doctors were employed to serve.

However, enslaved people were still exploited in the eighteenth century. Schiebinger sets these findings in the context of slavery, colonial expansion, the development of drug testing, and medical ethics of the time. She seeks to answer questions about how human subjects in this period were chosen for experiments, how notions of uniformity and variability across living organisms were developed. if tests done on white bodies were thought to hold for Black bodies and vice versa, and if male and female bodies were considered interchangeable.

Schiebinger also expands knowledge of African and American Indigenous contributions to health and medicine. Europeans tended to value medical knowledge of the peoples they encountered around the world. In the Caribbean, Europeans tested many of these medical techniques. Schiebinger explores what was thought of at the time as “slave medicine” (often a fusion of Indigenous and African cures) in the eighteenth-century West Indies. She argues that proper care of enslaved people as well as soldiers and sailors was a matter of moral concern in this period, but was also a means to secure the wealth of nations. Schiebinger analyzes the circulation of medical knowledge between Africa, Europe, and the Americas, and emphasizes that knowledge created in this period is inextricable from colonial conquest, slavery, violence, and secrecy.

== Personal life ==
Her partner is Robert N. Proctor, and her children are Geoffrey Schiebinger, a professor of mathematics and computational biology, and Jonathan Neel Proctor, a professor of environmental economics. She and her husband each gave their surname to one of their two children.

== Selected bibliography ==
=== Books ===
- European Commission. Directorate General for Research and Innovation. (2013). Schiebinger, Londa; Klinge, Ineke (eds.). Gendered innovations: How Gender analysis Contributes to research. Luxembourg: Publications Office of the European Union. doi:10.2777/11868. ISBN 978-92-79-25982-1.
- Schiebinger, Londa, ed. (2014). Women and Gender in Science and Technology. London: Routledge. ISBN 9780415855600.
- Schiebinger, Londa L. (2017). Secret cures of slaves: people, plants, and medicine in the eighteenth-century Atlantic world. Stanford University Press. ISBN 978-1-5036-0017-1.

=== Articles ===
- Schiebinger, Londa (September–October 2008). "Changing Assumptions". American Scientist. 96 (5): 428. doi:10.1511/2008.74.428.
- Zou, James; Schiebinger, Londa (18 July 2018). "AI can be sexist and racist — it's time to make it fair". Nature. 559 (7714): 324–326. doi:10.1038/d41586-018-05707-8. PMID 30018439.
- Tannenbaum, Cara; Ellis, Robert P.; Eyssel, Friederike; Zou, James; Schiebinger, Londa (November 2019). "Sex and gender analysis improves science and engineering". Nature. 575 (7781): 137–146. doi:10.1038/s41586-019-1657-6. PMID 31695204.
- Hunt, Lilian; Nielsen, Mathias Wullum; Schiebinger, Londa (29 September 2022). "A framework for sex, gender, and diversity analysis in research". Science. 377 (6614): 1492–1495. doi:10.1126/science.abp9775. PMID 36173857.

== Selected media coverage ==
- "Londa Schiebinger: Inclusive Design Will Help Create AI That Works for Everyone", by Prabha Kannan, Stanford Human-Centered AI Institute, July 2022
- "Women in STEM Need More Than a Law", by Caitlin McDermott-Murphy, Harvard Gazette, June 2022
- "The Researcher Fighting to Embed Analysis of Sex and Gender into Science", by Elizabeth Gibney, Nature, November 2020
- "Academics 'Need Training' on Sex and Gender in Research", by Ellie Bothwell, Times Higher Education, November 2019
- "Gender Diversity is Linked to Research Diversity, Stanford Historian Says", by Amy Adams, Stanford News, October 2018
- "Why Gendered Medicine Can Be Good Medicine", by Rena Xu, The New Yorker, November 2017
- "'성차 따른 의학연구·신약개발은 필수'", by 김나영, Kukmin Ilbo, May 2017
- "朴탄핵은 정치적 과오 탓...성별의 문제 아니다", by 황순민, 매일경제, March 2017
- "Science from women's lives. Better science?", by Carmen Magallón, Mètode, January 2017
- "– Kjønn må med", by Elin Rekdal Müller, Forskerforum, June 2015
- "Technology's Man Problem", by Claire Cain Miller, April 2014
- "Why It's Crucial to Get More Women Into Science", by Marguerite Del Giudice, National Geographic, November 2014
- "Q+A: Gender scholar Londa Schiebinger", by McKenzie Andrews, The Stanford Daily, May 2013
- "L’innovazione di genere è migliore", by Elisa Manacorda, Galileo, November 2013
- "'Tuve hijos tarde para poder pagar una asistenta'", by María R. Sahuquillo, El País, March 2011
- "Study: Housework benefit would help job productivity", ABC7, April 2010

== Awards ==
- Global Navigation board member, University of Tokyo, 2023
- Breakthrough in Science & Innovation Management, Falling Walls Foundation, 2022
- Honorary doctorate, University of Valencia, 2018
- Honorary doctorate, Lund University, 2017
- President's Recognition Award, American Medical Women's Association, 2017
- Pioneer Award, Impact of Gender/Sex on Innovation and Novel Technologies, 2016
- Linda Joy Pollin Women's Heart Health Leadership Award, Cedars-Sinai Medical Center, 2015
- Member, American Academy of Arts and Sciences, 2014
- Honorary doctorate, Vrije Universiteit Brussel, 2013
- Distinguished Affiliated Professor, Technical University of Munich, 2011
- Trustee, Technical University of Munich Institute for Advanced Studies, 2011
- Interdisciplinary Leadership Award, Stanford University School of Medicine Women's Health Program, 2010
- Trustee, RWTH Aachen University, 2007
- Maria Goeppert-Meyer Distinguished Visitor, University of Oldenburg, 2006
- James A. Rawley Prize, American Historical Association, for Plants and Empire, 2005
- Alf Andrew Heggoy Book Prize, French Colonial Historical Society, for Plants and Empire, 2005
- J. Worth Estes Prize, American Association for the History of Medicine, for Feminist History of Colonial Science, 2005
- Jantine Tammes Chair, University of Groningen Faculty of Mathematics and Natural Sciences, 2005
- Scholars Award, National Science Foundation, 2002
- Grant, National Science Foundation, 2001
- Senior Research Fellow, Max Planck Institute for the History of Science, 2000
- Humboldt Research Award, Alexander von Humboldt Foundation, 1999
- National Library of Medicine Fellowship, National Institutes of Health, 1998
- Scholars Award, National Science Foundation, 1996
- Margaret W. Rossiter History of Women in Science Prize, History of Science Society, for "Why Mammals Are Called Mammals", 1994
- Grant, German Research Foundation, 1995
- Guggenheim Fellowship, Solomon R. Guggenheim Foundation, 1991
- Scholars Award, National Science Foundation, 1991
- Humanist-in-Residence, Rockefeller Foundation, 1988
- Fellowship, National Endowment for the Humanities, 1986
- Fellowship, Rockefeller Foundation, 1985
- Grant, German Academic Exchange Service, 1985
- Charlotte W. Newcombe Doctoral Dissertation Fellowship, Woodrow Wilson Foundation, 1983
- Fellowship, Whiting Foundation, 1982
- Fulbright-Hays Doctoral Dissertation Research Abroad Fellowship, Harvard University, 1980
