= James A. Rawley Prize (AHA) =

The James A. Rawley Prize is awarded by the American Historical Association (AHA) for the best book in Atlantic history. The prize is given in memory of James A. Rawley, professor of history emeritus at the University of Nebraska–Lincoln.

Year	Winner AHA Rawley Prize	Title of AHA Rawley Prize
2026	Miranda Spieler	Slaves in Paris: Hidden Lives and Fugitive Histories (Harvard Univ. Press)
2025	Marc A. Hertzman	After Palmares: Diaspora, Inheritance, and the Afterlives of Zumbi (Duke Univ. Press)
2024	Nicholas Radburn	Traders in Men: Merchants and the Transformation of the Transatlantic Slave Trade (Yale Univ. Press)
2023	Adriana Chira	Patchwork Freedoms: Law, Slavery, and Race beyond Cuba’s Plantations (Cambridge Univ. Press)
2022	Tessa Murphy	The Creole Archipelago: Race and Borders in the Colonial Caribbean (Univ. of Pennsylvania Press)
2021	Allison Margaret Bigelow	Mining Language: Racial Thinking, Indigenous Knowledge, and Colonial Metallurgy in the Early Modern Iberian World (Omohundro Inst. of Early American History and Culture and the Univ. of North Carolina Press)
2020	Sophie White	Voices of the Enslaved: Love, Labor, and Longing in French Louisiana (Omohundro Inst. of Early American History and Culture and the Univ. of North Carolina Press)
2019	Elena A. Schneider	The Occupation of Havana: War, Trade, and Slavery in the Atlantic World (Omohundro Institute of Early American History and Culture and the Univ. of North Carolina Press)
2018	Padraic Scanlan	Freedom's Debtors: British Antislavery in Sierra Leone in the Age of Revolution (Yale Univ. Press)
2017	David Wheat	Atlantic Africa and the Spanish Caribbean, 1570–1640 (Omohundro Institute of Early American History and Culture and the Univ. of North Carolina Press)
2016	Tamar Herzog	Frontiers of Possession: Spain and Portugal in Europe and the Americas (Harvard Univ. Press)
2015	Ada Ferrer	Freedom's Mirror: Cuba and Haiti in the Age of Revolution (Cambridge Univ. Press)
2015	Gregory O'Malley	Final Passages: The Intercolonial Slave Trade of British America, 1619–1807 (Univ. of North Carolina Press for the Omohundro Inst. of Early American History and Culture)
2014	Aaron Spencer Fogleman	Two Troubled Souls: An Eighteenth-Century Couple's Spiritual Journey in the Atlantic World (Univ. of North Carolina Press)
2013	W. Jeffrey Bolster	The Mortal Sea: Fishing the Atlantic in the Age of Sail (Harvard Univ. Press)
2012	Rebecca J. Scott and Jean Hebrard	Freedom Papers: An Atlantic Odyssey in the Age of Emancipation (Harvard Univ. Press)
2011	David Eltis and David Richardson	Atlas of the Transatlantic Slave Trade (Yale Univ. Press)
2011	James Sweet, Domingos Álvares	African Healing, and the Intellectual History of the Atlantic World (Univ. of North Carolina Press)
2010	Michael Jarvis	In the Eye of All Trade: Bermuda, Bermudians, and the Maritime Atlantic World, 1680–1683 (Univ. of North Carolina Press for the Omohundro Inst. of Early American History and Culture)
2009	Maria Elena Martinez	Genealogical Fictions: Limpieza de Sangre, Religion, and Gender in Colonial Mexico (Stanford Univ. Press)
2008	Marcus Rediker	The Slave Ship: A Human History (Viking Press)
2007	Sabine MacCormack	On the Wings of Time: Rome, the Incas, Spain, and Peru (Princeton Univ. Press)
2006	Christopher Brown	Moral Capital: Foundations of British Abolitionism (Univ. of North Carolina Press for the Omohundro Inst. of Early American History and Culture)
2005	Londa Schiebinger	Plants and Empire: Colonial Bioprospecting in the Atlantic World (Harvard Univ. Press)
2004	Laurent Dubois	A Colony of Citizens: Revolution and Slave Emancipation in the French Caribbean, 1787–1804 (Univ. of North Carolina Press for the Omohundro Inst. of Early American History and Culture)
2003	John Pagan	Anne Othwood's Bastard: Sex and Law in Early Virginia (Oxford Univ. Press)
2002	Patricia Seed	American Pentimento: The Invention of Indians and the Pursuit of Riches (Univ. of Minnesota Press)
2001	Jorge Canizares-Esguerra	How to Write the History of the New World: Histories, Epistemologies, and Identities in the Eighteenth-Century Atlantic World (Stanford Univ. Press)
2000	Karen Kupperman	Indians and English: Facing Off in Early America (Cornell Univ. Press)
1999	Jeremy Adelman	Republic of Capital: Buenos Aires and the Legal Transformation of Atlantic World (Stanford Univ. Press)

== See also ==
- List of history awards
