= Pnina Abir-Am =

Israeli-American historian of science

Pnina Geraldine Abir-Am (Hebrew: פנינה גרלדין אביר-עמ; born 1947) is an Israeli and American historian of science whose work has focused on the history of molecular biology and women and gender in science. Educated in Israel, Canada, and England, she has held research and visiting positions at many universities in Israel, Canada, and the United States. Since 2007 she has been a scholar at Brandeis University.

== Education and career ==
Abir-Am is a citizen of Israel and the United States. She was an undergraduate at the Hebrew University of Jerusalem, where she received a bachelor's degree in chemistry with a minor in biology in 1971. She returned to the Hebrew University for a 1975 master's degree in the history and philosophy of science, summa cum laude, with a thesis on the discovery of the structure of DNA. She completed a Ph.D. at the Université de Montréal in 1984, after a year as a visiting student at the Wellcome Institute for the History of Medicine at the University of London. Her dissertation, The Biotheretical Gathering and the Origins of Molecular Biology in England, 1932–38, was supervised by Camille Limoges.

She was a lecturer at the Hebrew University of Jerusalem in 1973–1975, 1982–1983, and 1996–1997, a visiting associate professor at Johns Hopkins University from 1991 to 1993, and co-chair of Women's Studies in a joint program of the University of Ottawa and Carleton University from 1996 to 1997. In 1995, as a research associate of the Center for History and Philosophy of Science at Boston University, she was named as a Resident Fellow of the Dibner Institute for the History of Science and Technology at the Massachusetts Institute of Technology for 1995–1996. For 1996–1997, she was a Beckman Center Fellow at the Science History Institute in Philadelphia. In 2012–2013, she was the first Resident Scholar in the Oregon State University libraries. Since 2007, she has been a scholar in the Women's Studies Research Center at Brandeis University, in the Greater Boston area.

== Recognition ==
Abir-Am received the 1988 Margaret W. Rossiter History of Women in Science Prize of the History of Science Society, for a chapter about Dorothy Maud Wrinch ("Synergy or Clash: Disciplinary and Marital Strategies in the Career of Mathematical Biologist Dorothy Wrinch") in her book Uneasy Careers and Intimate Lives. She was named as a Fellow of the American Association for the Advancement of Science in 2023.

== Selected publications ==
Abir-Am is the author of research articles including:

- Abir-Am, Pnina (August 1982), "The discourse of physical power and biological knowledge in the 1930s: a reappraisal of the Rockefeller Foundation's 'policy' in molecular biology", Social Studies of Science, 12 (3): 341–382, doi:10.1177/030631282012003001, PMID 11611075
- Abir-Am, Pnina (March 1985), "Themes, genres and orders of legitimation in the consolidation of new scientific disciplines: deconstructing the historiography of molecular biology", History of Science, 23 (1): 73–117, doi:10.1177/007327538502300103, PMID 11611688
- Abir-Am, Pnina G. (March 1987), "The Biotheoretical Gathering, trans-disciplinary authority and the incipient legitimation of molecular biology in the 1930s: new perspective on the historical sociology of science", History of Science, 25 (1): 1–70, doi:10.1177/007327538702500101, PMID 11621261
- Abir-Am, Pnina G. (January 1992), "The politics of macromolecules: molecular biologists, biochemists, and rhetoric", Osiris, 7: 164–191, doi:10.1086/368709, JSTOR 301771, PMID 11615242

Her edited volumes include:

- Uneasy Careers and Intimate Lives: Women in Science, 1789–1979 (1987)
- Creative Couples in the Sciences (1996)
